= List of nicknames of serial killers =

This is a list of nicknames of serial killers.

== List ==
=== 0–9 ===
- ".22 Caliber Killer":
  - Donna Perry
  - Joseph Christopher
- ".22 Caliber Killers" – Gary and Thaddeus Lewingdon
- ".38 Caliber Killer" – David Bullock
- ".44 Caliber Killer" – David Berkowitz
- "60 Freeway Slayer" – Ivan Hill
- "7.65 Caliber Killer" – Roberto Spinetti

=== A ===
- "ABC Serial Killer" – Moses Sithole
- "Accra Strangler" – Charles Quansah
- "Acid Bath Murderer" – John Haigh
- "Adman Rapist" – Bobby Joe Long
- "Alligator Man" – Joe Ball
- "American Bluebeard" – Helmuth Schmidt
- "American Jack the Ripper" – William Dean Christensen
- "Angarsk Maniac" – Mikhail Popkov
- "Angel Face" – Robledo Puch (Spanish: Cara de Ángel)
- "Angel Makers of Nagyrév" – Group of Hungarian killers active in 1914–1929
- "Angel of Bremen" – Gesche Gottfried
- "Angel of Death"
  - Beverley Allitt
  - Roger Andermatt
  - Richard Angelo
  - Charles Cullen
  - Kristen Gilbert
  - Donald Harvey
  - Robledo Puch (Spanish: El Angel de la Muerte)
  - Efren Saldivar
  - Harold Shipman
- "Anthrax Killer" – Unsolved
- "Apache" – Yves Trudeau
- "Ape Man" – Gordon Stewart Northcott
- "Aqueduct Murderer" – Diogo Alves
- "Arch Murderer of Marrakech" – Hadj Mohammed Mesfewi
- "Arkhangelsk Maniac" – Vladimir Tretyakov
- "Artvin Monster" – Adnan Çolak
- "Asghar the Murderer" – Ali Asghar Borujerdi
- "Assistant Death in Luzem" – Roger Andermatt
- "Athens Ripper" – Antonis Daglis
- "Atlanta Child Killer" – Wayne Williams
- "Atlanta Lover's Lane Murderer" – Unsolved
- "Atlanta Ripper" – Unsolved
- "Atteridgeville Mutilator" – Moses Sithole
- "Aunt Thally" – Caroline Grills
- "Auto Shankar" – Gowri Shankar
- "Axe Killer" – Elifasi Msomi
- "Axeman of New Orleans" – Unsolved
- "Axlar-Björn" – Björn Pétursson

=== B ===
- "B1 Butcher" – Unsolved
- "Babe" – Baekuni
- "Babysitter" – Unsolved
- "Babyface Killer" – Lesley Eugene Warren
- "Backpacker Killer" – Ivan Milat
- "Backpacker Murderer" – Francis Heaulme
- "Bahadurgarh Baby Killer" – Satish
- "Baotouge" – Zhou Kehua (Chinese: 爆头哥; lit. 'Mr. Headshot' or 'Brother Headshot')
- "Barnaul Maniac" – Vitaly Manishin
- "Baseline Killer" – Mark Goudeau
- "Bataysk Maniac" – Konstantin Cheryomushkin
- "Baton Rouge Serial Killer" – Derrick Todd Lee
- "Beast" – Luis Garavito (Spanish: La Bestia)
- "Beast of Atteridgeville" – Johannes Mashiane
- "Beast of Baltimore" – Joe Metheny
- "Beast of Birkenshaw" – Peter Manuel
- "Beast of British Columbia" – Clifford Olson
- "Beast of Manchester" – Trevor Hardy
- "Beast of Montmartre" – Thierry Paulin
- "Beast of Oberfranken" – Manfred Wittmann
- "Beast of the Andes" – Daniel Camargo Barbosa
- "Beast of the Bastille" – Guy Georges
- "Beast of the Black Forest" – Heinrich Pommerenke
- "Beast of the Railway Station" – Carl Großmann
- "Beast of Ukraine" – Anatoly Onoprienko
- "Beasts of Satan" – Group of Italian killers active in 1998–2004
- "Beauty Queen Killer" – Christopher Wilder
- "Bedroom Basher" – Gerald Parker
- "Bedroom Strangler" – Russell Maurice Johnson
- "Beer Man" – Unsolved 2006–2007 murders in Mumbai, India
- "Beltway Sniper" – John Allen Muhammad and Lee Boyd Malvo
- "Bentong Kali" – Kalimuthu s/o Pakirisamy Thevar
- "Berrima Axe Murderer" – John Lynch
- "Bible John" – Unsolved
- "Big Harpe" – Micajah Harpe
- "Big-Eared Midget" – Cayetano Santos Godino (Spanish: El Petiso Orejudo)
- "Bigfoot"
  - Unsolved 1975 American murders
  - Philip Smith
- "Bike Path Rapist" – Altemio Sanchez
- "Bitsa Park Maniac" – Alexander Pichushkin
- "Black Angel" – Robledo Puch (Spanish: El Ángel Negro)
- "Black Doodler" – Unsolved
- "Black Panther" – Donald Neilson
- "Black Widow"
  - Elfriede Blauensteiner
  - Judy Buenoano
- "Black Widower"
  - Lowell Amos
  - Gabriel Garza Hoth
- "Blackout Ripper" – Gordon Cummins
- "Bloody Benders" – Family of American killers active in 1872–1873
- "Blood Countess" – Elizabeth Báthory
- "Bludgeon Killer" – Gerald Parker
- "Bluebeard" – Gilles de Rais
- "Bluebeard of Paris" – Henri Désiré Landru
- "Bluebeard of Quiet Dell" – Harm Drenth Harry Powers
- "Bluebeard of South Texas" – Joe Ball
- "Boa" – Sergey Golovkin
- "Bodenfelde Black Widows" – Pair of German killers active in 1994–2000
- "Boetie Boer" – Stewart Wilken
- "Boksburg Killer" – Moses Sithole
- "Bondage Killer" – Robert Berdella
- "Boogey Man" – Albert Fish
- "Boozing Barber" – Gilbert Paul Jordan
- "Borgia of America" – Martha Wise
- "Boston Belfry Murderer" – Thomas W. Piper
- "Boston Strangler" – Albert DeSalvo
- "Boxcar Killer" – Robert Joseph Silveria Jr.
- "Bremerhaven Serial Killer" – Olaf Däter
- "Brick Killer" – Amir Qayyum
- "Brick Moron" – Robert Nixon
- "Brides-in-the-Bath Murderer" – George Joseph Smith
- "Britain’s Own Hannibal" – Robert Maudsley
- "Brooklyn Strangler" – Vincent Johnson
- "Brooklyn Vampire" – Albert Fish
- "Broomstick Killer" – Kenneth McDuff
- "Brownout Strangler" – Eddie Leonski
- "B.T.K. Strangler" – Dennis Rader
- "Bullseye Killer" – John William Cooper
- "Butcher Baker" – Robert Hansen
- "Butcher Knife Billy" – Billy Glaze
- "Butcher of Berlin" – Carl Großmann
- "Butcher of Blind Creek" – Gerard John Schaefer
- "Butcher of Elmendorf" – Joe Ball
- "Butcher of Hanover" – Fritz Haarmann
- "Butcher of Iași" – Vasile Tcaciuc
- "Butcher of Mons" – Unsolved
- "Butcher of Niebuszewo" – Józef Cyppek
- "Butcher of Plainfield" – Ed Gein
- "Butcher of Rostov" – Andrei Chikatilo
- "Butterbox Baby Killers" – Lila and William Young
- "Buttermilk Bluebeard" – Alfred Leonard Cline

=== C ===
- "Cabo Bruno" – Florisvaldo de Oliveira
- "Camden Ripper" – Anthony Hardy
- "Campus Killer" – Ted Bundy
- "Candlelight Killer" – Robert Liberty
- "Candyman" – Dean Corll
- "Cannibal" – Peter Bryan
- "Cannibal of Ankara" – Özgür Dengiz
- "Cannibal of Kosovo" – Kosovar serial killer active in 1997–1999
- "Cannibal of Ziębice" – Karl Denke
- "Cape Cod Vampire" – Tony Costa
- "Capital Park serial killer" – Samuel Sidyno
- "Carlos the Jackal" – Ilich Ramírez Sánchez
- "Čaruga of Zagorje" – Vinko Pintarić
- "Casanova Killer"
  - Paul John Knowles
  - Glen Edward Rogers
- "Chambermaid Slayer" – Gerald Thomas Archer
- "Charlie Chop-off" – Unsolved
- "Chessboard Killer" – Alexander Pichushkin
- "Chicago Abductor" – Brian Dugan
- "Chicago Rippers" – Group of Illinois killers
- "Chijon Family" – Group of Korean killers active in 1994
- "Chikatilo" – List of Soviet and post-Soviet serial killers nicknamed after Andrei Chikatilo
- "Choke and Stroke Killer" – Samuel Little
- "Chopper" – Mark Read
- "Cincinnati Strangler" – Posteal Laskey
- "Citizen O" – Anatoly Onoprienko
- "Citizen X" – Andrei Chikatilo
- "Clairemont Killer" – Cleophus Prince Jr.
- "Classified Ad Rapist" – Bobby Joe Long
- "Cleveland Killer" – Moses Sithole
- "Cleveland Strangler" – Anthony Sowell
- "Cleveland Torso Murderer" – Unsolved
- "Confession Killer" – Henry Lee Lucas
- "Connecticut Borgia" – Amy Archer-Gilligan
- "Co-Ed Butcher" – Edmund Kemper
- "Co-Ed Killer" – John Norman Collins
- "Corridor Killer" – Steven Brian Pennell
- "Collector" – Robert Berdella
- "Cop Killer" – Barry Prudom
- "Costa Killer" – Tony Alexander King
- "Craigslist Killer" – Richard Beasley (serial killer)
- "Craigslist Ripper" – Nickname for the Long Island serial killer.
- "Crazy Charles" – Charles Ray Hatcher
- "Crazy Dave" – David Edward Maust
- "Crazy Joe" – Joseph Naso
- "Cross Country Killer" – Glen Edward Rogers
- "Cross Maniac" – Dyonathan Celestrino
- "Crossbow Cannibal" – Stephen Griffiths
- "Crow Killer" – John Johnson
- "Cul-De-Sac Killer" – Stephen Akinmurele
- "Cyanide Mallika" – KD Kempamma
- "Cyanide Mohan" – Mohan Kumar
- "Cyclist Killer" – Farid Baghlani

=== D ===
- "D.C. Sniper" – John Allen Muhammad and Lee Boyd Malvo
- "Dallas Ripper" – Charles Albright
- "Damsel of Death" – Aileen Wuornos
- "Danilovsky Maniac" – Unsolved
- "Dark Strangler" – Earle Nelson
- "Dating Game Killer" – Rodney Alcala
- "Dayton Strangler" – Unsolved
- "Death Angel" – Robledo Puch
- "Death Angels" – Group of American killers active in 1969–1974
- "Death Row Romeo" – Manuel Pardo (serial killer)
- "Demon Midwife" – Miyuki Ishikawa
- "Demon in the Belfry" – Theodore Durrant
- "Der Totmacher" – Rudolf Pleil
- "Detroit Serial Killer" – Benjamin Atkins
- "Doctor Death"/"Dr. Death"
  - Jack Kevorkian
  - Maxim Petrov
  - Harold Shipman
  - Santosh Pol
  - Christopher Duntsch
- "DOG HELL 666" – Dyonathan Celestrino
- "Donnybrook Serial Killer" – Christopher Mhlengwa Zikode
- "Doodler" – Unsolved
- "Double Initial Killer" – Joseph Naso
- "Doubles Killer" – Werner Boost
- "Dracula Killer" – Richard Chase
- "Dr. No (serial killer)" – Unsolved
- "Duck Island Killer" – Clarence Hill
- "Duisburg Man-Eater" – Joachim Kroll
- "Dusseldorf Doubles Killer" – Werner Boost

=== E ===
- "East Area Rapist" – Joseph James DeAngelo
- "East-Harlem Rapist" – Arohn Kee
- "East Paris Killer" – Guy Georges
- "Eastbound Strangler" – Unsolved
- "Educated Killer" – Edward H. Rulloff
- "El Coqueta" – César Armando Librado Legorreta
- "El Cura" – Luis Garavito
- "El Gato Imperial" – Raúl Osiel Marroquín
- "El Psicópata" – Unsolved
- "Eyeball Killer" – Charles Albright

=== F ===
- "Father Bluebeard" – András Pándy
- "February 9 Killer" – Juan Antonio Arreola Murillo
- "First Nations Killer" – John Martin Crawford
- "Flying Nightmare" – Robert Hansen
- "Forces of Evil" – William Henry Hance
- "Forest Maniac" – Unsolved
- "Forest Park (Serial) Killer" – Todd Alan Reed
- "Forest Strip Killer" – Andrei Chikatilo
- "Forgotten Cannibal" – Karl Denke
- "Frankford Slasher" – Leonard Christopher
- "Frankston Killer" – Paul Denyer
- "Freeway Killer"
  - Vernon Butts
  - William Bonin
  - Patrick Kearney
  - Randy Kraft
  - William Pugh
- "Freeway Phantom" – Unsolved
- "French Ripper" – Joseph Vacher

=== G ===
- "Gaffney Strangler" – Lee Roy Martin
- "Gainesville Ripper" – Danny Rolling
- "Gansu Ripper" – Gao Chengyong
- "Gas Man" – Harald Sassak
- "Gatchina Psychopath" – Vasily Smirnov
- "Gay Slayer" – Colin Ireland
- "Genesee County Serial Slasher" – Elias Abuelazam
- "Genesee River Killer" – Arthur Shawcross
- "Gentleman Killer" – Władysław Mazurkiewicz
- "Georgia Black Widow" – Janie Lou Gibbs
- "Gert" – Gert van Rooyen
- "Ghoul of Grays Harbor" – Billy Gohl
- "Giggling Grandma" – Nannie Doss
- "Gilgo Beach Killer" – Rex Heuermann
- "Glamour Girl Slayer" – Harvey Glatman
- "Godfather of Matamoros" – Adolfo Constanzo (Spanish: El Padrino de Matamoros)
- "Godmother" – Sara Aldrete (Spanish: La Madrina)
- "Goiânia Serial Killer" – Tiago Henrique Gomes da Rocha
- "Golden State Killer" – Joseph James DeAngelo
- "Gold Sock Killer" – Unsolved
- "Good Doctor" – Harold Shipman
- "Good Lady of Loudun" – Marie Besnard
- "Gorilla Killer" – Earle Nelson
- "Gorky Maniac" – Gennady Ivanov
- "Granny Killer" – John Wayne Glover
- "Granny Ripper" – Tamara Samsonova
- "Gray Man" – Albert Fish
- "Green Chain Rapist" – Robert Napper
- "Green Man" – Albert DeSalvo
- "Green River Killer" – Gary Ridgway
- "Grim Maniac" – Nikolai Dudin
- "Grim Reaper of Paris" – Thierry Paulin
- "Grim Sleeper" – Lonnie David Franklin Jr.
- "Grindr Killer" – Stephen Port
- "Grocery Bag Killer" – Robert Lee Yates
- "Guangzhou Ripper" – Li Wenxiang
- "The Gunma Kodaira" – Kiyoshi Ōkubo

=== H ===
- "Haifa Homeless Killer" – Nicolai Bonner
- "Hairy One" – Augustine Chacon
- "Hamamatsu Deaf Killer" – Seisaku Nakamura
- "Hamburg Rubble Murderer" – Unsolved
- "Hammer Killer" – Norbert Poehlke
- "Hammer Killer of Frankfurt" – Arthur Gatter
- "Hangman" – Gerard John Schaefer
- "Hannibal" – Scott Lee Kimball
- "Hannibal Lecter of the Andes" – Dorángel Vargas
- "Hanover Werewolf" – Fritz Haarmann
- "Happy Face Killer" – Keith Hunter Jesperson
- "Harbor City serial shootings" – Unsolved
- "Headbanger" – Peter Sutcliffe
- "Heidemörder (Heath Murderer)" – Thomas Holst
- "Hell's Belle" – Belle Gunness
- "Hermit of St. Bonnot" – Gilles Garnier
- "Highway Hooker" – Aileen Wuornos
- "Highway Killer" –
  - Larry Eyler
  - Omid Barak
- "Hillside Stranglers" – Kenneth Bianchi and Angelo Buono Jr.
- "Hippopotamus" – Sergei Ryakhovsky
- "Hog Trail Murderer" – Daniel Conahan
- "Holiday Killer" – Ulrich Schmidt
- "Holloway Stranger" – Tony Alexander King
- "Hollywood Slasher" – Doug Clark
- "Homicidal Slasher" – Michael Wayne McGray
- "Honolulu Strangler" – Unsolved
- "Hook Man" – Edward Edwards (serial killer)
- "Human Tiger" – Jean-Baptiste Troppmann
- "Huttenkloas" – Klaas Annink
- "Hwaseong Murderer" – Lee Choon-jae

=== I ===
- "I-5 Bandit" – Randall Woodfield
- "I-5 Killer" – Roger Kibbe
- "I-70 killer – Unsolved
- "Iceman" – Richard Kuklinski
- "Imperial Avenue Murderer" – Anthony Sowell
- "Index Killer" – Unsolved 1988 murders in Seattle, United States
- "Inmates Killer" – Diego Casanova (Note: Also translated as The Convicts' Killer)
- "Internet Black Widow" – Melissa Ann Shepard
- "Internet Slavemaster" – John Edward Robinson
- "Interstate Killer" – Jaiden Demery
- "Ipswich Ripper" – Steve Wright
- "Iron Man" – Craig Price
- "Iskitim Maniac" – Fyodor Kozlov

=== J ===
- "Jack the Butcher" – Unsolved
- "Jack the Ripper"
  - Unsolved 1880s and 1890s murders in London, United Kingdom
  - Unsolved 1911–1912 murders in Atlanta, United States
  - Unsolved 1915 murders in New York, United States
- "Jack the Strangler"
  - Unsolved 1894–1903 murders in Denver, United States
  - Unsolved 1900s murders in Dayton, United States
- "Jack the Stripper" – Unresolved
- "Jackal"
  - Robin Jackson
  - Robledo Puch (Spanish: El Chacal)
- "Japanese Bluebeard" – Yoshio Kodaira
- "Jeffries the Monster" – Thomas Jeffries
- "Jesse Sitting Crow" – Billy Glaze
- "Jesus Killer" – Jimmy Maketta
- "Joel the Ripper" – Joel Rifkin
- "Jolly Black Widow" – Nannie Doss

=== K ===
- "Kamensky Maniac" – Igor Chernat
- "Kanpatimar" – Shankariya
- "Kansas City Butcher" – Robert Berdella
- "Kansas City Strangler" – Lorenzo Gilyard
- "Kansas City Vampire" – Marc Sappington
- "Katóka Street Killer" – Gusztáv Nemeskéri
- "Ken and Barbie Killers" – Paul Bernardo and Karla Homolka
- "Kentucky Cannibal" – Boone Helm
- "Killer Butler" – Archibald Hall
- "Killer Clown" – John Wayne Gacy
- "Killer Cop" – Gerard John Schaefer
- "Killer from the Shadows" – Marcel Barbeault
- "Killer Handyman" – William Patrick Fyfe
- "Killing Cousins" – David Alan Gore and Fred Waterfield
- "Killing Dentist" – Glennon Engleman
- "Kindly Killer" – Dennis Nilsen
- "King of the Thugs" – Behram
- "Kirmes Killer" – Jürgen Bartsch
- "Kranskop Killer" – Samuel Bongani Mfeka
- "Krasnoyarsk Beast" – Vadim Ershov
- "Kukri" – Javed Iqbal
- "Kursk Maniac" – Anatoly Nagiyev
- "Killer Nurse" – Brenda Agüero

=== L ===
- "La Bestia" – Luis Garavito
- "Lady Blue Beard" – Nannie Doss
- "Lady Death" – Daisy de Melker
- "Lady Dracula" – Elizabeth Báthory
- "Lady Killer" – Ricardo Caputo
- "Lainz Angels of Death" – Group of Austrian killers active in 1983–1989
- "Lake Elsinore Killer" – William Suff
- "Landlady Killer" – Dorothea Puente
- "Death House Landlady" – Dorothea Puente
- "Lambeth Poisoner" – Thomas Neill Cream
- "Las Poquianchis" – Group of Mexican killers active in 1950s–1960s
- "Laser Man" – John Ausonius
- "Last Call Killer" – Richard Rogers
- "Leather Apron" – Alternate nickname for "Jack the Ripper". Unsolved
- "Leningrad Maniac" – Philipp Tyurin
- "Lethal Lovers" – Gwendolyn Graham and Cathy Wood
- "Lima Ripper" – Unsolved (Note: Triple murderer Ángel Díaz Balbín was charged with these murders. However, Díaz Balbín was murdered by psychologist Mario Poggi during an evaluation, for which Díaz Balbín never stood trial and cannot be considered legally guilty.)
- "Limpopo Serial Killer" – Mukosi Freddy Mulaudzi
- "Limpopo Serial Rapist" – Fanuel Makamu
- "Lipstick Killer" – William Heirens
- "Lisbon Ripper" – Unsolved
- "Little Harpe" – Wiley Harpe
- "Little Old Lady Killer" – Juana Barraza
- "Little Peter the Killer" – Pedro Rodrigues Filho (Portuguese: Pedrinho Matador)
- "Liver-Eating Johnson" – John Johnson
- "Łódź Gay Murderer" – Unsolved
- "London Chambermaid Killer" – Gerald Thomas Archer
- "London Hammer Killer" – Levi Bellfield
- "Lonely Hearts Killer"
  - Nannie Doss
  - Harvey Glatman
- "Lonely Hearts Killers" – Raymond Fernandez
- "Long Beach Bluebeard" – William Johansen
- "LISK" (Long Island Serial Killer) – Rex Heuermann
- "Love Slave Killers" – Gerald and Charlene Gallego
- "Luberetsky Maniac" – Nikolai Shestakov
- "Lust Killer" – Jerry Brudos
- Ludwig – Wolfgang Abel and Marco Furlan

=== M ===
- "Madman of the route" – Unsolved
- "Machete Murderer" – Juan Corona
- "Macedonian Raskolnikov" – Viktor Karamarkov
- "Mad Beast" – Andrei Chikatilo
- "Mad Butcher" – Ed Gein
- "Mad Butcher of Kingsbury Run" – Also known as the "Cleveland Torso Murderer". Unsolved
- "Mad Dog"
  - Leslie Irvin
  - Marion Albert Pruett
- "Mad Killers of Brabant" – Unsolved
- "Mad Strangler of Boston" – Albert DeSalvo
- "Maid Killer" – Martin Dumollard
- "Mail-Order Bluebeard" – Harry Powers
- "Mall Passer" – Mike DeBardeleben
- "Managua Ripper" – Unsolved
- "Manchester Pusher" – Unsolved
- "Man in Black" – Peter Moore
- "Man with the Hammer" – Romulus Vereș
- "Manny" – Manuel Pardo
- "Marahao Boy Mutilator" – Francisco das Chagas Rodrigues de Brito
- "Marty" – Harrison Graham
- "Mataviejitas" – Juana Barraza
- "Meanest Man in America" – Donald Henry Gaskins
- "Measuring Man" – Albert DeSalvo
- "Metal Fang" – Nikolai Dzhumagaliev
- "Mexican Jack" – Macario Alcala Canchola
- "Mexican Ripper" – Francisco Guerrero Pérez
- "Miami Strangler – Unsolved
- "Midday Murderer" – Klaus Gossmann
- "Midtown Torso Slasher" – Richard Cottingham
- "Midtown Slasher" – Joseph Christopher
- "Milwaukee Cannibal" – Jeffrey Dahmer
- "Milwaukee North Side Strangler" – Walter E. Ellis
- "Minnie" – Williamina Dean
- "Missoula Mauler" – Wayne Nance
- "Mobster of Wyoming" – Mark Allen Hopkinson
- "Molalla Forest Killer" – Dayton Leroy Rogers
- "Monster Butler" – Archibald Hall
- "Monster Killer" – Yang Xinhai
- "Monster of Aosta" – Andrea Matteucci
- "Monster of Bolzano" – Marco Bergamo
- "Monster of Brussels" – Junior Kabunda
- "Monster of Cannock Chase" – Raymond Leslie Morris
- "Monster of Czinkota" – Béla Kiss
- "Monster of Düsseldorf" – Peter Kürten
- "Monster of Florence" – Unsolved
- "Monster of Foligno" – Luigi Chiatti
- "Monster of Machala" – Gilberto Chamba
- "Monster of the Mangones" – Unsolved
- "Monster of Merano" – Ferdinand Gamper
- "Monster of Miramichi" – Allan Legere
- "Monster of Modena" – Unsolved
- "Monster of Montluel" – Martin Dumollard
- "Monster of Montmartre" – Thierry Paulin
- "Monster of Montserrat" – Fredy Armando Valencia
- "Monster of Nerola" – Ernesto Picchioni
- "Monster of Pont-Rouge" – Léopold Dion
- "Monster of Rome" – Ralph Brydges
- "Monster of Sarzana" – Giorgio Vizzardelli
- "Monster of the Andes" – Pedro López
- "Monster of the Ardennes" – Michel Fourniret
- "Monster of the Cane Fields" – Manuel Octavio Bermúdez
- "Monster of the Rivers" – Arthur Shawcross
- "Monster of Thuleni" – Bulelani Mabhayi
- "Monster of Udine" – Unsolved
- "Monster of Zollikerburg" – Erich Hauert
- "Monsters of Ecatepec" – Pair of Mexican serial killers active in 2012–2018
- "Moon Maniac" – Albert Fish
- "Moors Murderers" – Ian Brady and Myra Hindley
- "Morumbi Monster" – José Paz Bezerra
- "Mr. Sam" – Samuel Little
- "Muswell Hill Murderer" – Dennis Nilsen
- "Muti Serial Killer" – Moses Sithole

=== N ===
- "Namibia's B1 Butcher" – Unsolved
- "Nebraska Boy Snatcher" – John Joubert
- "Nebraska Fiend" – Stephen Dee Richards
- "Necrophile Rebel" – Mikhail Novosyolov
- "Night Caller" – Eric Edgar Cooke
- "Night Demon" – Oleksandr Berlizov
- "Night Stalker" – Richard Ramirez
- "Nighttime Killers" – Pair of Ukrainian serial killers active in 1991–1996
- "Niterói Vampire" – Marcelo Costa de Andrade
- "Notting Hill Nassen Killer" – John Christie
- "Novokuznetsk Monster" – Alexander Spesivtsev
- "Novosibirsk Maniac" – Yevgeny Chuplinsky
- "Novouralsk Ripper" – Yevgeny Petrov

=== O ===
- "Oakland County Child Killer" – Unsolved
- "Ogre of Aptos" – Edmund Kemper
- "Ogress of Colonia Roma" – Felícitas Sánchez Aguillón
- "Ogress of Reading" – Amelia Dyer
- "Ohio Outdoorsman Killer" – Thomas Dillon
- "Oklahoma City Butcher" – Unsolved
- "Old Lady Killer"
  - Juana Barraza
  - Thierry Paulin
- "Original Night Stalker" – Joseph James DeAngelo
- "Otaku Murderer" – Tsutomu Miyazaki
- "Other Baton Rouge Killer" – Sean Vincent Gillis

=== P ===
- "Panama/Costa Rica Serial Killer" – William Dathan Holbert
- "Pancho López" – Fernando Hernández Leyva
- "Pangaman" – Elias Xitavhudzi
- "Papa Denke" – Karl Denke
- "Patches the Clown" – John Wayne Gacy
- "Paris Serial Killer" – Yoni Palmier
- "Park Maniac" – Francisco de Assis Pereira
- "Pee Wee" – Donald Henry Gaskins
- "Peterborough Ditch Murders" – Joanna Dennehy
- "Phantom Killer" – Unsolved
- "Phantom of Heilbronn" – Debunked
- "Phantom Sniper" – Frank Carter
- "Phoenix Strangler" – Sipho Thwala
- "Pickup Truck Killer" – Nirut Sonkhamhan
- "Pied Piper" – Dean Corll
- "Pied Piper of Staten Island" – Andre Rand
- "Pied Piper of Tucson" – Charles Schmid
- "Pig Farmer Killer" – Robert Pickton
- "Pig Man" – Robert Pickton'
- "Pigheaded Killer" – Robert Pickton
- "Pillow Killer" – Yvan Keller
- "Piranha Family" – Group of Japanese serial killers active in 2011
- "Plainfield Ghoul" – Ed Gein
- "Playing Card Killer" – Alfredo Galán
- "Pliers" – Lawrence Bittaker
- "Plumstead Ripper" – Robert Napper
- "Pogo the Clown" – John Wayne Gacy
- "Poisoner" – Catherine Monvoisin (French: La Voison)
- "Poisoner of Monserrat" – Yiya Murano (Spanish: La Envenenadora de Monserrat)
- "Pops" – James Edward Pough
- "Pork Chop Rob" – Robert Pickton
- "Potton Poisoner" – Sarah Dazley
- "Poughkeepsie Killer" – Kendall Francois
- "Povorino Maniac" – Vladimir Retunsky
- "Prime Evil" – Eugene de Kock
- "Psycho Raman" – Raman Raghav
- "Psycho Samrat" – Sabuj Sheikh
- "Psycho Shankar" – M. Jai Shankar

=== Q ===
- "Queen of Poisoners" – Marie Besnard
- "Queen Poisoner" – Lydia Sherman

=== R ===
- "Racist Killer" – Joseph Paul Franklin
- "Rae Bareli Serial Killer" – Raman Raghav
- "Railroad Killer"
  - Ángel Maturino Reséndiz
  - Rudy Bladel
  - Themba Vilakazi
- "Railway Killers" – John Duffy and David Mulcahy
- "Railway Sniper" – Rudy Bladel
- "Rainbow Killer" – Raúl Osiel Marroquín
- "Rainbow Maniac" – Jairo Francisco Franco
- "Raincoat Killer" – Yoo Young-chul
- "Rainy Night Butcher" – Lam Kor-wan
- "Rambo Bentong" – Rabidin Satir
- "Ratcliff Highway Demon" – John Williams
- "Reading Baby Farmer" – Amelia Dyer
- "Red Phantom" – Alternate nickname of the Zodiac Killer. Unsolved
- "Red Ripper" – Andrei Chikatilo
- "Redneck Charles Manson" – Donald Henry Gaskins
- "Rest Area Killer" – Donald Leroy Evans
- "Rhein-Ruhr Ripper" – Frank Gust
- "Ripper Jayanandan" – K. P. Jayanandan
- "Rio Bravo Assassin" – Pedro Padilla Flores
- "River Man" – Thozamile Taki
- "River Parishes Serial Killer" – Daniel Blank
- "Riverside Killer" – William Suff
- "Rochester Strangler" – Arthur Shawcross
- "Rostov Maniac" – Andrei Chikatilo
- "Rostov Ripper" – Andrei Chikatilo
- "Ruhr Cannibal" – Joachim Kroll

=== S ===
- "Sacramento Slayer" – Morris Solomon Jr.
- "The Sadist" – Raúl Osiel Marroquín
- "Sadist of El Chanquito" – Daniel Camargo Barbosa
- "Sălcuța serial killer" – Unsolved
- "Saloon Killer" – Velaphi Ndlangamandla
- "San Francisco Sex Slayer" – William Johansen
- "San Juan del Sur Psychopath – Unsolved
- "San La Muerte Killer" – Marcelo Antelo (Spanish: Asesino de San La Muerte)
- "San Mateo Slasher – Unsolved
- "Sana’a Ripper" – Mohammed Adam Omar
- "Santa Strangler" – Adolph Theodore Laudenberg
- "Sätermannen" – Unsolved
- "Satyr of San Isidro" – Francisco Antonio Laureana
- "Saw-Killer of Hanover" – Unsolved.
- "S-Bahn Murderer" – Paul Ogorzow
- "Scarborough Rapist" – Paul Bernardo
- "Schoolgirl Strangler" – Arnold Sodeman
- "Scorecard Killer" – Randy Kraft
- "Seashore Serial Killer" – Nickname for the Long Island serial killer. Unsolved
- "Serial Killer of Merano" – Ferdinand Gamper
- "Serial Shooters" – Dale Hausner and Samuel Dieteman
- "Serial Street Shooter" – Unsolved
- "Servant Girl Annihilator" – Unsolved
- "Seven Bridges Killer" – Unsolved
- "Severed leg killer – Unsolved
- "Sex Beast" – Melvin Rees
- "Sex Devil" – Lam Kwok-wai (Chinese: 色魔, Sik Moh)
- "Sex Slave Killers" – Gerald and Charlene Gallego
- "Shabolovka Street Killer" – Vasili Komaroff
- "Shadow Killer" – Marcel Barbeault
- "Shoe Fetish Slayer" – Jerry Brudos
- "Shoe Maker" – Joseph Kallinger
- "Shotgun Killer" – Christopher Peterson
- "Shotgun Man" – Unsolved
- "Shotgun Stalker" – James Swann
- "Siberian Ripper" – Alexander Spesivtsev
- "Sidetrack" – Robert Joseph Silveria Jr.
- "Singing Serial Killer" – K. P. Jayanandan
- "Singing Stranger" – Eddie Leonski
- "Sister Godfrida" – Cecile Bombeek
- "Skid Row Slasher" – Vaughn Greenwood
- "Skid Row Slayer" – Michael Player
- "Skid Row Stabber" – Unsolved
- "Skin Hunters" – Group of Polish killers, active in the early 2000s
- "Skopinsky Maniac" – Vyacheslav Markin
- "Slavemaster" – John Edward Robinson
- "Sleepy Hollow Killer" – Unsolved
- "Slitter of Women’s Throats" – Francisco Guerrero Pérez
- "Smelly Bob" – Robert Black
- "Smolensky Strangler" – Vladimir Storozhenko
- "Snapshot Killer" – Christopher Wilder
- "Soap Maker of Correggio" – Leonarda Cianciulli
- "Son of Sam" – David Berkowitz
- "Sons of Death" – Nickname for the Thuggee cult
- "Southern California Strangler" – Randy Kraft
- "Southern Psychopath" – Adrián Arroyo Gutiérrez
- "Southland Strangler" – John Floyd Thomas Jr.
- "Southside Rapist" – Timothy Wilson Spencer
- "Speed Freak Killers" – Pair of American killers active in 1984–1990
- "Spider Killer" – Saeed Hanaei
- "Spokane Serial Killer" – Robert Lee Yates
- "Springfield Strangler" – Alfred Gaynor
- "Station Strangler" – Norman Afzal Simons
- "Stocking Strangler" – Carlton Gary
- "Stockwell Strangler" – Kenneth Erskine
- "Stoneman" – Unsolved 1985–1989 Indian murders
- "Strangler Bill" – Wayne Boden
- "Strangler of Aachen" – Egidius Schiffer
- "Strangler of Valpocevera" – Maurizio Minghella
- "Storyville Slayer" – Unsolved
- "Suffolk Strangler" – Steve Wright
- "Sugarcane Serial Killer" – Thozamile Taki
- "Suicide Website Murderer" – Hiroshi Maeue
- "Sunday Morning Slasher" – Carl Eugene Watts
- "Sunderland Slayer" – Steven Grieveson
- "Sunset Strip Killers" – Doug Clark and Carol Bundy
- "Svietlahorsk Nightmare" – Igor Mirenkov
- "Sydney Mutilator" – William MacDonald

=== T ===
- "Taco Bell Strangler" – Henry Louis Wallace
- "Tacoma Axe Murderer" – Jake Bird
- "Taganrog Maniac" – Yuri Tsiuman
- "Tagansky Maniac" – Andrei Evseev
- "Tamiami Strangler" – Rory Enrique Conde
- "Teacup Poisoner" – Graham Young
- "Terminator" – Anatoly Onoprienko
- "Terror of Brandenburg Forest" – Willi Kimmritz
- "The Hammer Maniac" – Vladimir Sulima
- "The Last Maniac of the USSR" – Dmitry Gridin
- "The Maniac from Lenenergo" – Andrei Sibiryakov
- "Thrill Killer" – Richard Biegenwald
- "Thug Behram" – Behram
- "Timber Town Killer" – Billy Gohl
- "Tiny" – Joe Metheny
- "Tipster killer" – Robert Maury
- "Tomilinsky Maniac" – Boris Gusakov
- "Tool Box Killers" – Lawrence Bittaker and Roy Norris
- "Torso Killer" – Richard Cottingham
- "Torture Doctor" – H. H. Holmes
- "Toy-Box Killer" – David Parker Ray
- "Trailside Killer" – David Carpenter
- "Trash Bag Killer" – Patrick Kearney
- "Tribilin" – Luis Garavito
- "Tube Sock Killer" – Unsolved
- "Truck Stop Killer"
  - Bruce Mendenhall
  - Robert Ben Rhoades
- "Twitter Killer" – Takahiro Shiraishi

=== U ===
- "Ulyanovsky Maniac" – Anatoly Utkin
- "Unabomber" – Ted Kaczynski
- "Ust-Kamenogorsk Maniac" – Yuri Ivanov

=== V ===
- "Valley Intruder" – Richard Ramirez
- "Vampire Killer"
  - John Brennan Crutchley
  - John Haigh
- "Vampire of Argentina" – Florencio Fernández
- "Vampire of Bucharest" – Ion Rîmaru
- "Vampire of Bytów" – Leszek Pękalski
- "Vampire of Düsseldorf" – Peter Kürten
- "Vampire of Gałkówek" – Stanisław Modzelewski
- "Vampire of London" – John Haigh
- "Vampire of Niterói" – Marcelo Costa de Andrade
- "Vampire of Sacramento" – Richard Chase
- "Vampire Rapist" – Wayne Boden
- "Vampires of the Tehran Desert" – Mohammed Bijeh
- "Vienna Strangler" – Jack Unterweger
- "Vnukovo Maniac" – Yuri Raevsky
- "Volga Maniac" – Radik Tagirov
- "Voroshilovgrad Maniac" – Zaven Almazyan

=== W ===
- "Walk-In Killer" – Richard Ramirez
- "Wall Butcher" – Semih Çelik (Turkish: Sur Kasabı)
- "Want-Ad Killer" – Harvey Carignan
- "Wartime Ripper" – Gordon Cummins
- "Warwick Slasher" – Craig Price
- "Wednesday Strangler" – Unsolved
- "Weekend Murderer" – Milton Johnson
- "Weepy Voice Killer" – Paul Michael Stephani
- "Wemmer Pan Killer" – Cedric Maake
- "Werewolf" – Mikhail Popkov
- "Werewolf Butcher" – Jack Owen Spillman
- "Werewolf of Dole" – Gilles Garnier
- "Werewolf of Wysteria" – Albert Fish
- "West Mesa Bone Collector" – Unsolved
- "West Virginia Bluebeard" – Harry Powers
- "West-End Serial Killer" – Jack Mogale
- "Westside Rapist" – John Floyd Thomas Jr.
- "Whitechapel Murderer" – Alternate nickname for "Jack the Ripper". Unsolved
- "Window cleaner from Deurne" – Stephaan Du Lion
- "Witch Doctor" – Adolfo Constanzo
- "Witch of Corregio" – Leonarda Cianciulli
- "Wolf Man" – Michael Lupo
- "Wolf of Moscow" – Vasili Komaroff
- "Woodford Slasher" – John Joubert
- "Woodward Corridor Killer" – Benjamin Atkins

=== Y ===
- "Yaritsuki" – Saito Hiroemon
- "Yorkshire Ripper" – Peter Sutcliffe
- "Yosemite (Park) Killer" – Cary Stayner
- "Ypsilanti Ripper" – John Norman Collins

=== Z ===
- "Zama Suicide Pact Killer" – Takahiro Shiraishi
- "Zardad's Dog" – Abdullah Shah
- "Zodiac (Killer)"
  - Unsolved 1960s–1970s American murders
  - Heriberto Seda

== Sources ==
- Gibson, Dirk C. (28 November 2014). Serial Killers Around the World: The Global Dimensions of Serial Murder. Bentham Science Publishers. ISBN 978-1-60805-842-6.
- Hall, Susan (2020). "Facts and Figures". The World Encyclopedia of Serial Killers: T-Z. Vol. 4. Denver, Colorado: WildBlue Press. ISBN 9781952225369.
- Mellor, Lee (3 March 2012). Cold North Killers: Canadian Serial Murder. Dundurn. ISBN 978-1-4597-0125-0.
- Newton, Michael (February 2006). The Encyclopedia of Serial Killers. Infobase Publishing. ISBN 978-0-8160-6987-3.
- Rosewood, Jack; Lo, Rebecca (19 June 2017). The Big Book of Serial Killers: 150 Serial Killer Files of the World's Worst Murderers. LAK Publishing. ISBN 978-1-64845-040-2.
- Schechter, Harold; Everitt, David (4 July 2006). The A to Z Encyclopedia of Serial Killers. Simon and Schuster. ISBN 978-1-4165-2174-7.
