= Zaven =

Zaven (Armenian: Զավեն) is an Armenian masculine given name. Notable people with the name include:

- Zaven I, 4th-century catholicos of the Armenian Apostolic Church
- Zaven I Der Yeghiayan of Constantinople (1868–1947), Armenian Patriarch of Constantinople
- Zaven Badoyan (born 1989), Armenian football player
- Zaven Collins (born 1999), American football player
- Zaven Andriasian (born 1989), Armenian chess Grandmaster
- Zaven Yaralian (born 1952), American football coach
- Zaven Paré (born 1961), French new media artist
- Zaven Biberyan (1921–1984), Turkish writer, editor, and author of Armenian descent
- Zaven Kouyoumdjian (born 1970), Lebanese talk show host, producer and television personality
- Zaven Almazyan (1950–1973), Soviet serial killer and rapist
- Leon Zaven Surmelian (1905–1955), Armenian-American author
