= Lists of serial killers =

List of lists

This is a list of lists of serial killers.

- List of serial killers by country
  - List of serial killers in Brazil
  - List of serial killers in Chile
  - List of serial killers in China
  - List of serial killers in Colombia
  - List of Czech serial killers
  - List of French serial killers
  - List of German serial killers
  - List of Japanese serial killers
  - List of serial killers in Italy
  - List of Russian serial killers
  - List of serial killers in South Africa
  - List of serial killers in the United Kingdom
  - List of serial killers in the United States
- List of serial killers by number of victims: Includes only killers active after 1900
- List of serial killers before 1900
- List of serial killers active in the 2020s
- List of nicknames of serial killers
  - List of Soviet and post-Soviet serial killers nicknamed after Andrei Chikatilo
