= Sulima =

Sulima may refer to:

- Sulima, Sierra Leone, a city in West Africa
- Sulima Chiefdom, a Sierra Leone Chiefdom
- Sulima coat of arms, used in Poland
- Sulima (surname)
- Sulima (simulator): a full-system MIPS simulator
