= Sulima (surname) =

Sulyma or Sulima (Ukrainian: Сулима) is a ukrainian surname. It may refer to:

== Sulyma ==
- Ivan Sulyma, Ukrainian Cossack leader
- Nikolai Sulima (Mykola Sulyma; 1777–1840), general of the Imperial Russian Army during Napoleonic Wars and the November Uprising

== Sulima ==
- Alyaksandr Sulima (born 1979), Belarusian footballer
- George Sulima (1928–1987), American football player
- Jan Sulima, pseudonym of Josef Szulc (1875–1956), Polish-French composer
- Stefan Sulima, pseudonym of Władysław Ogrodziński, Polish historian and writer
- Stefan Sulima-Popiel (1896–1927), Polish footballer
- Vladimir Sulima (1946–1968), Soviet murderer also known as "The Bloody Casanova"
