= Gold Sock Killer =

American serial killer

- Born: XX Century
- Other name: Sock Strangler
- Years active: July – August 1973
- Status: Unidentified
- Motive: Sexual

Details
- Victims: 3 killed 1 survived
- Country: United States
- State: Florida
- Weapon: Socks (Different colors)
- Date apprehended: N/A

The Gold Sock Killer is the moniker of an unidentified American serial killer who murdered a woman and two teenage girls in Broward County, Florida, between July and August 1973. His nickname came from how he strangled his victims to death with socks; however, a gold-colored sock was only used in two instances.

== Murders ==
On the night of July 15, 1973, 42-year-old Jonina Gudjonsdottir Kelpein was beaten and strangled to death with a gold-colored stretch sock in her car, which was parked in the driveway of her Fort Lauderdale home. Her purse was missing, but her dog was alive in the backseat of the car. Her body was then dragged about a mile from her home and dumped in the yard of a house on the 200 block of Northeast 12th Avenue. Kelpien was last seen alive at 3:00 a.m. that night, walking to her car while intoxicated. Some reports state that she was seen in a convenience store at around 3:00 a.m. Thirty minutes later, a man walked into the same convenience store and told the clerk that he had been questioned by police in a woman's murder. However, Kelpien's body was not found until 7:00 a.m. An autopsy revealed that she had sexual intercourse shortly before her death.

On July 25, 1973, a woman, 25, was attacked by the perpetrator in her first-story apartment on the 400 block of Northeast 16th Avenue in Fort Lauderdale. At 9:15 p.m., the perpetrator wrapped a sock around her neck as she entered her apartment. The woman fought back, kicking and screaming at her attacker. During the struggle, a coffee table had been overturned and the two fell onto the couch. The assailant then fled the scene, likely fearing that the victim's screams would alert others of the attacker. The assailant, described as a slim, blonde-haired, white man, had gained entry into the apartment by prying open a window. Before attacking the victim, he rummaged through the victim's purse, which was located in her closet. Due to a gold sock being used in both crimes, police suspected that the attack was connected to the murder of Jonina Kelpien.

On August 8, 1973, two men hunting for land crabs discovered the body of Teresa Ann Williams, 17, in a marshy area off Sheridan street in Hollywood, Florida. A maroon sock was wrapped around her neck, and she was only wearing a bra and top. A pile of clothing, suspected to be hers, was found near her body. Williams' remains were too badly decomposed to determine whether or not she had been sexually assaulted. The place her body was found could only be accessed by foot, and required the crossing of at least one creek or ditch. She was last seen alive ten blocks away on August 3. Her car was later found with a flat tire in the parking lot of an apartment building. Tenants of the building called police after they heard her cat meowing in the backseat of the car.

On August 28, 1973, 16-year-old Marisue Curtis was last seen at her apartment complex at Surf Road. At 8:00 p.m. that night, she left her parents' apartment to go downstairs. Wearing a swimsuit and a jacket, Curtis went downstairs for thirty minutes. The last person to see her alive was her friend, who was also downstairs. At 8:30 p.m., she told her friend that she had to go back upstairs. At 7:00 a.m. the next day, Curtis' nude body was discovered by a construction worker in the Intracoastal Waterway. Her body was submerged six inches below the surface, held down by two concrete blocks. A black sock was found tied around her neck.

== Investigation ==
After Jonina Kelpien's murder, investigators questioned sex offenders in the area. Police also surveilled the crime scenes, questioning anyone who acted suspicious near them. In total, over 200 people were questioned. 35 of these people were given lie detector tests, and each of them passed. Forensic analysts determined the socks used in Kelpien's murder and the attempted murder were from a different pair. Plaster samples of fingerprints and footprints were also taken from the crime scene of the attempted murder.

Police had one strong suspect in the case, a man who strangled a woman to death with a scarf in her Broward County apartment in February 1974. Investigators noticed similarities between that murder and the gold sock stranglings. The man was questioned by police about the gold sock stranglings, but was never charged in connection to those murders.

== See also ==
- Violence against women in the United States
- Flat-Tire murders
- List of serial killers in the United States
