= Marc Sappington =

American spree killer

- Born: Marc Vincent Sappington; February 9, 1978 (age 48)
- Other name: The Kansas City Vampire
- Status: Incarcerated
- Motive: Schizophrenia
- Convictions: First degree murder (4 counts); Aggravated robbery Aggravated burglary Kidnapping
- Penalty: Life imprisonment

Details
- Date: March 16 – April 10, 2001
- Country: United States
- State: Kansas
- Killed: 4
- Weapons: Knives and guns

Marc Vincent Sappington (born February 9, 1978) is an American spree killer and cannibal convicted of murdering four acquaintances in March and April 2001 in Kansas City, Kansas. He gained notoriety for eating part of the leg of one of his victims, Alton "Fred" Brown.

Lawyers for Sappington blamed the four-day killing spree on a history of schizophrenia and daily use of the hallucinogenic drug PCP. Sappington himself claimed that voices in his head told him to eat flesh and blood or he would die.

Sappington was convicted on June 23, 2004, of murdering Terry T. Green, 25, Michael Weaver Jr., 22, and Alton "Fred" Brown Jr., 16 in April 2001. Sappington was convicted on December 10, 2004, of an attempted aggravated robbery and murder of David Mashak at his auto dealership in March 2001. Sappington's conviction was affirmed by the Kansas Supreme Court on November 2, 2007.

In an April 2001 videotape, Sappington had confessed to stabbing Weaver to death, leaving Green's body in a car, and shooting Brown before dismembering his body and eating a small piece of his leg.

== See also ==
- List of incidents of cannibalism
