= Józef Cyppek =

Polish murderer

- Born: 20 August 1895; Oppeln, German Empire
- Died: 3 November 1952 (aged 57); Szczecin, Poland
- Cause of death: Execution by hanging
- Conviction: Murder
- Penalty: Death

Details
- Victims: 1+
- Span of crimes: 19??–1952
- Country: Poland

Józef Cyppek (20 August 1895 – 3 November 1952) was a Polish murderer and suspected serial killer, called the Butcher of Niebuszewo (Polish: Rzeźnik z Niebuszewa). He was sentenced to death and executed for the murder of Irena Jarosz, but it is suspected he committed other crimes.

== Youth ==
Józef Cyppek was born in Oppeln (German empire) in 1895. He was a locksmith by profession. Since the outbreak of the First World War he worked as a locksmith on the railroad. In 1915 he was appointed to the army, losing his leg during military service. He spent two years in hospitals. At the time he became a member of the Communist Party of Germany. He used a prosthetic leg.

He came to Szczecin in 1952. First, he lived at Wawrzyniak Street. Later he was resettled to the building in Wilsona 7 (today Niemierzyńska 7). He had a flat on the ground floor. Initially, for a few days he lived with a young blond, who he claimed was his son. Later the boy was not seen anymore. He worked as a driver.

== Physical appearances ==
Józef Cyppek was rather short, 158 cm tall. He was, however, stocky and with a good build. He had large hands, as evidenced by the thumbprint in the police files.

Cyppek's origin was unclear even after his death. He spoke excellent German, while in prison records it was written that his citizenship and nationality were Polish. It is also worth noting that Cyppek allegedly had a swastika tattooed under his arm.

== Murder ==
The crime took place on 11 September 1952. Cyppek lured his neighbour, 20-year-old Irena Jarosz, to his apartment, then hit her on the head with a hammer and killed her. Jarosz had a routine appointment with a colleague from work - Zofia S. Whenever they'd meet, Zofia S. would wait for Jarosz. This time it was different. Zofia S. found the apartment open with a crying 7-month-old child inside. The woman took care of the child and waited for about two hours for Jarosz. Around 18:30, the 25-year-old husband of the victim returned. At home, in addition to his wife's disappearance, he noticed that several items—blankets, quilts, sheets, a suit and a watch—were missing. Worried about his wife, the husband inquired with the neighbours, including Cyppek. While there, he noticed Jarosz's dress, and through the window, he saw his eiderdown. He reported the matter to the militia. When officers arrived, they did not find the culprit, who was at the cinema. After Cyppek returned, they stopped him and entered the apartment.

Irena's corpse lay in the room on the couch, her head cut off, her arms, legs, and outstretched guts. Hands and one thigh at the closet. Guts - in a bucket under the window. In the kitchen on the sink, chairs and doors, red spots - the part ineptly scrubbed. On the shelf by the tiled kitchen, the bowl is half filled with red liquid. Next to the meat grinder with grinding marks. Human heart and liver on plates. On the table in a pan, scrambled eggs with some fat. Next to the bread with lard, tomato salad and a piece of raw meat, probably beef. The apartment was full of bottles of beer and vodka.

— Police note

No head - it is not known what was the immediate cause of death.

— Note from doctor performing the autopsy

The method of quartering the corpses - one-off cuts, without repetition, equally in the joints and the extraction of internal organs testify to the professionalism of the perpetrator, the skilful technique.

— Note from second doctor

== Investigation ==
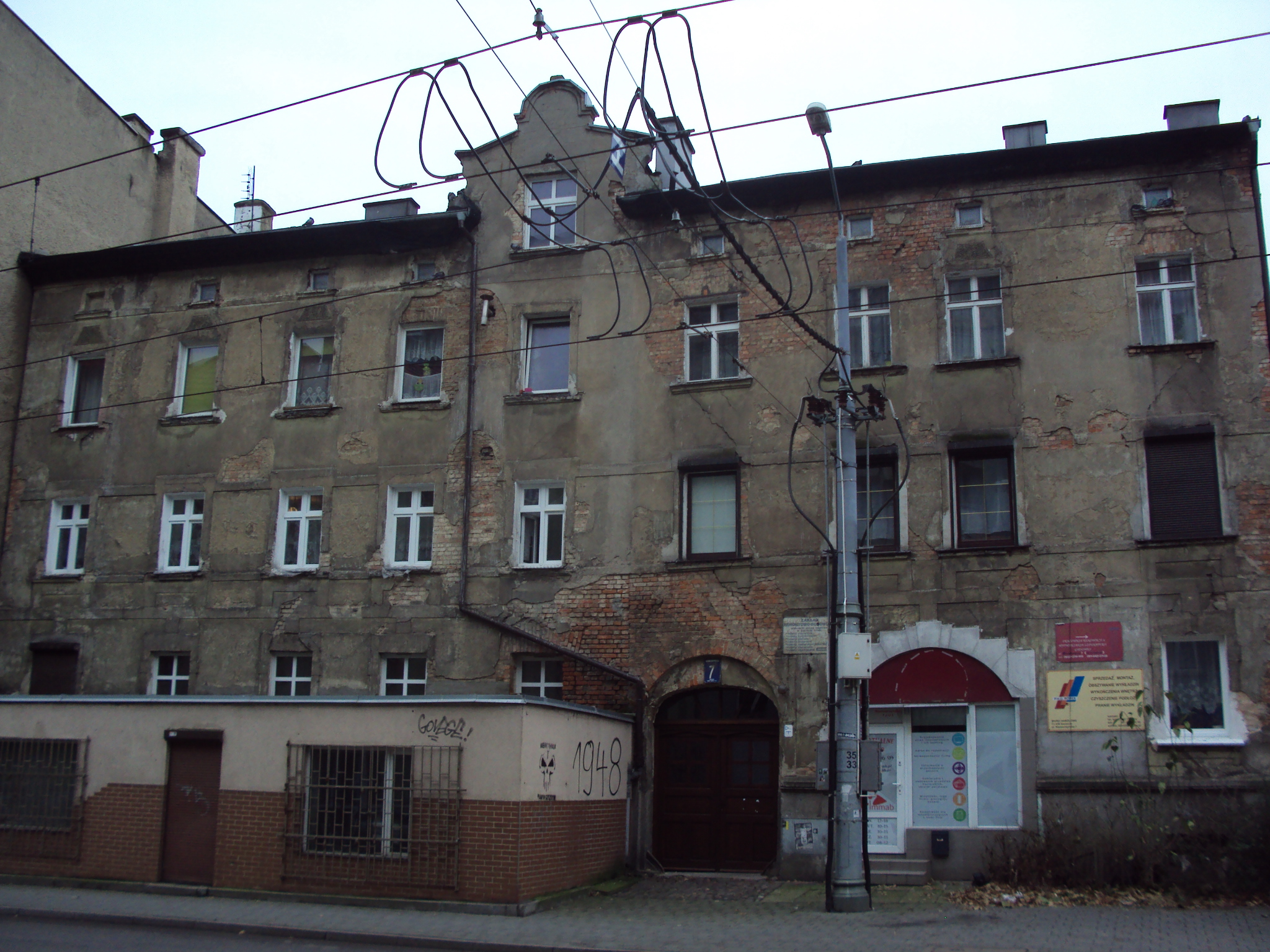
Tenement house at 7 Niemierzyńska Street in Szczecin, where Cyppek lived

During the investigation, Cyppek admitted to drowning Jarosz in the nearby lake Rusałka. He claimed that he wanted to sleep with his neighbour, which she refused. When asked why he cut up the corpse, he answered that he wanted to take it away in pieces. During the investigation of his apartment, militiamen found clothes not belonging to Jarosz, including women's shoes, panties and children's clothes. Cyppek also had a medical book in German. He claimed that he used the medical book privately to study. There is no information on children's clothes in the sources.

During the investigation, other facts also surfaced. The cashier of the cinema opposite apparently sent children who lacked money for a ticket to Cyppek. She told the children that the gentleman who lives in the neighbouring apartment would give them the money they were missing. Cyppek allegedly killed the children, and dismembered their corpses in an abandoned warehouse, later the Higher School of Agriculture (now the West Pomeranian University of Technology). He also allegedly processed bodies for edible products there. It is not clear what exactly happened, but it is known that he sold his own products at the nearby bazaar.

In the course of the investigation, Lake Rusałka was drained. Allegedly, up to a dozen human skulls were found in it, for the most part, children's.

== Process ==
The process - in an ad hoc mode - lasted only a few days. For the murder of Irena Jarosz, on 17 September 1952, Cyppek was sentenced to death. He asked the Polish President Bolesław Bierut for a pardon, which he did not receive. Cyppek was executed on 3 November 1952, at 17:45. He was buried in secret at the Central Cemetery of Szczecin.

== Years later ==
The apartment where Cyppek lived was unoccupied for a long time because nobody wanted to live there. After sitting empty, it was divided into a storage room and lavatories, and part of the premises was allocated to an adjoining flat. Later a shoemaker's house was located there. A private company is now situated there.

== In popular culture ==
In 2012, an amateur feature film was created based on the events there called Wilson 7, directed by Szczecin student Jakub Boronia.

== See also ==
- List of serial killers by country
