= Lisbon Ripper =

Unidentified Portuguese serial killer

Details
- Victims: 3–9
- Span of crimes: 1992 – 1993 (possibly 1988–2000)
- Country: Portugal (possibly also the United States, Denmark, Czech Republic, the Netherlands and Belgium)

The Lisbon Ripper (Portuguese: O Estripador de Lisboa) was an unidentified serial killer who, between 1992 and 1993 murdered three prostitutes in Lisbon, Portugal.

== Crimes ==
The first victim was 22-year-old Maria Valentina, nicknamed "Tina", who frequented the area around Avenidas Novas, Avenidas Defensores de Chaves and Avenida Cinco de Outubro, in Lisbon. She was found on July 31, 1992, in a large cabin in Póvoa de Santo Adrião, lying in a pool of her own blood. She had been strangled, disembowelled, and some of her internal organs had been removed.

The second victim, 24-year-old Maria Fernanda, was found on 27 January 1993, in a large cabin in Entrecampos, Lisbon, by railway construction workers who were working at a nearby railway bridge. She was also disembowelled, and some internal organs had been removed.

The third and last victim was 27-year-old Maria João, a resident at Santo António dos Cavaleiros, north of Lisbon, who lived alone. She was found on 15 March 1993, near the location of the first victim (of whom she was a friend). Like the previous victims, she was disembowelled, but this time almost all her organs were removed.

All the victims were young brunettes named Maria, allegedly prostitutes and drug addicts, and were disembowelled with a sharp object that was not a knife, possibly a scalpel.

== Investigations ==
When the Prevention Service of the Homicide Department received a call about the first murder, members of the Judiciary Police (PJ) who arrived at the scene were shocked at the brutality of Maria Valentina's murder. The deceased was then brought to expert medical examiner Jose Sombreirero, who claimed to have never seen such a thing in 40,000 autopsies and 30 years of experience. In the subsequent investigation, it was revealed that the victim was either a prostitute or a drug addict, known from childhood as "Tina". Throughout 1992, numerous telephone calls and anonymous letters were received about the murder. Each was investigated, but all lacked solid evidence.

On 27 January of the following year, the Ripper attacked again, this time killing Maria Fernanda, whose body was found by railway workers. An entire police brigade was mobilised, but nobody doubted that the perpetrator was the same: the body had been shredded, with the same organs removed and near the same area. This time, the killer had also cut off her breasts in the cabin at Entrecampos. In the investigation, it was revealed that, like the first victim, Fernanda was a prostitute.

The Police opened the case on 3 January 1993, after the death of Maria Fernanda, investigating both her and Valentina's pasts. Six men worked 24 hours a day on the same case and sometimes even with the support of the drug trafficking department, which seconded employees from its nighttime surveillance brigade.

"There were clues between Lisbon and Cascais about several people relating to their past, but everything was informal, without enough evidence to arrest or even question anyone," lamented coordinator João de Sousa. The police knew that the serial killer (or serial killers) would murder again and soon, but lacked any clues to charge anybody.

On 15 March, the Ripper attacked and killed his third victim - Maria João. She had been mutilated in the same way as Fernanda and Valentina, but this time, all of her organs had been removed. Like the other victims, she too had either been a prostitute or a drug addict.

However, there was little or no evidence found at the crime scene: no blood (except from the victims), hair, footprints, fingerprints, or glove material. The Police had some suspects, but no evidence against them.

== Ripper's profile ==
Coroner Jose Sombrereiro, through examining his crimes, determined that the Ripper was probably a solitary man, unrelated to his victims and most likely above suspicion. His crimes could be considered 'perfect', as there were no clues to any potential culprit.

The Ripper probably knocked his victims unconscious with strong blows to the head, something he had most likely practised, then plucked out the heart, liver and lungs, lingering around the bodies but leaving no trace. He kept his victims' faces intact, never clearing away the blood. The three crimes were committed at night (probably at dawn, which explains the absence of witnesses).

== Suspects ==
On 30 November 2011, nineteen years after the murders, one suspect, José Pedro Guedes, aged 46, had his name put forward by his son Joel, aged 21, who had applied to appear on the Secret Story - A Casa dos Segredos 2 reality show. On the show, contestants are kept locked away for 10 weeks in a house, and each contestant has to conceal a secret while everyone else has to try and discover it. The secret Joel applied with was "I am the son of the Lisbon Ripper". This information aroused the Polícia Judiciária's suspicions. Before his arrest, José Guedes confessed details of the murders to the online edition of the Sol newspaper.

Although he could not be tried for the Lisbon Ripper's murders as they had lapsed under Portugal's statute of limitations in 2008, José Guedes was arrested due to his possible connection with Filipa Ferreira's murder in 2000, in Aveiro. However a comparison between the suspect's version of the facts and the evidence found at the crime scenes revealed José Guedes was not the Lisbon Ripper. The Polícia Judiciária compared the palm print the Ripper had left on a carton of milk with Guedes's own, and realised they don't match. In his version of the facts, José Guedes said he didn't own a car and used to hitchhike to Lisbon with friends, returning by bus at twenty-five to one in the morning. However, a prostitute had reported to the authorities that she had heard one of the Ripper's victims crying at 1 AM. Guedes could not be convicted of the Lisbon murders, but was still kept under arrest pending further inquiries about the murder in Aveiro. In 2013, José Guedes was released due to the lack of evidence.

== Other crimes ==
There were two other alleged prostitutes found dead in the same region. Between 1993 and 1997, there were also four similar murders in the Netherlands, the Czech Republic, Denmark, and Belgium. This led the authorities to believe that the Ripper could be a long-haul truck driver, but, as none of the other potential murders were solved, this remains speculation.

There was a lead that the Lisbon Ripper may have been a serial killer active in New Bedford, Massachusetts, in 1988, known as the New Bedford Highway Killer. In March 1993, two agents from the FBI arrived in Lisbon after the third murder. They brought photos and reports of similar crimes committed in 1988 in New Bedford, where there is a large Portuguese community. According to the FBI's theory, the killer was a member of the Portuguese community in New Bedford who had left the city and travelled back to Portugal, where he returned to work. A few days later, the PJ arrested a suspect, but he was soon released for lack of evidence. However, the bodies of the victims in Portugal were horribly mutilated and those in New Bedford weren't, and since the two agents eventually returned to the US, no connection could be made, and the identity of that killer remains unknown.

== Prosecution ==
In 2005, the statute of limitations on the murders of the other two prostitutes in 1990 entered into effect. However, later PJ investigations concluded that although there were similarities among the crimes, they only found evidence to connect the three murders from 1992 to 1993.

Even if the murderer is discovered in the future, he can not be tried or imprisoned, because under the Penal Code of Portugal, the statute of limitations comes into force 15 years after the crime.

== In the media ==
In 1996, Francisco Moita Flores wrote a script for a series titled Polícias, which portrayed the judicial police investigating deaths caused by a similar murderer. The first episode of the series, renamed to Cidade Despida and shown on RTP1 in 2010, reported on the daily life of the PJ brigade, including cases like that of cyclist Pedro Lopes and the modus operandi of the Ripper.

== See also ==
- List of fugitives from justice who disappeared
