= Robert Liberty =

American serial killer

- Liberty's mugshot
- Born: Robert Willard Liberty; May 15, 1947; California, U.S.
- Died: January 20, 1971 (aged 23); San Diego, California, U.S.
- Cause of death: Strangulation
- Other names: The Candlelight Killer; The Candle Murderer
- Motive: Sexual sadism
- Conviction: Never convicted
- Penalty: Never sentenced

Details
- Victims: 3
- Span of crimes: 1966–1970
- Country: United States
- State: California
- Date apprehended: June 9, 1970

Robert Willard Liberty (May 15, 1947 – January 20, 1971), known as The Candlelight Killer, was an American serial killer who murdered two men in Southern California from March to June 1970 in ritualistic style, and left taunting messages behind for authorities to find. Liberty had spent three years in a mental hospital prior to the murders for killing his girlfriend in 1966. In 1971, while awaiting trial for the new killings, Liberty was murdered by a fellow inmate.

== Murder of Marcella Landis ==
In 1966, while housed at Orange County Medical Center, Liberty, then 19, met 31-year-old Marcella Landis. Like Liberty, Landis was being treated after a suicide attempt. The two eventually entered a relationship, and after both were released, Liberty eventually began living in Landis' apartment. On June 4, 1966, Liberty strangled Landis to death with a silk stocking. After the murder, he dressed up the body and applied makeup to it, before laying it on a couch and lit candles from her head to her feet and placing a Bible on her chest.

When police entered the apartment, they found Liberty strumming a guitar next to Landis' body, and he was arrested. On August 26, a judge declared Liberty insane, and he was ordered to spend 90 days at the Atascadero State Hospital in San Luis Obispo County. In February 1967, a judge accepted a plea of insanity and Liberty was found not guilty by reason of insanity in Landis' murder, and he was transferred to the Vacaville State Hospital.

== 'Candlelight' killings ==
=== Thomas Astorina ===
By 1969, psychiatrists who had interviewed Liberty had all claimed that he had recovered. On June 2, 1969, Liberty walked out of Metropolitan State Hospital a free man, after his doctor mislabeled him as discharged. Once located, Liberty stated he thought he had been released, but was returned to Orange County Medical Center. Liberty was freed as legally sane on September 15, 1969, with no supervision to be required.

Afterwards, he moved to Costa Mesa and began living with three other men in an apartment. On March 12, 1970, Liberty fatally shot one of his roommates, 25-year-old Thomas Astorina, a father of two. Liberty was charged with the murder, but later took off to avoid the charge. A warrant was issued by the Federal Bureau of Investigation (FBI) for flight to avoid prosecution.

=== Robert Irion ===
Liberty, now on the run, befriended Kendall Bierly, and the two began a romantic relationship. On June 6, Liberty and Bierly were hitchhiking in Long Beach. They were picked up by 17-year-old Richard Greytak. Liberty brandished a gun and forced Greytak to take them to Liberty's mother's house in Westminster. Once there, Liberty robbed his mother of $45 at gunpoint. He then went back to the car, where he forced Greytak to drive them to San Diego. There, Liberty directed him into a nearby building, where they broke into the apartment of 53-year-old Robert J. Irion, a former patient of the same mental hospital where Liberty was housed and who was now a nurse.

Liberty tied up Irion and Greytak, and kept them like that for hours while he and Bierly scoured the apartment. At midnight, Liberty decided to kill Irion, and fatally beat him to death. He displayed the body on the bedroom floor and lit candles on the head. He then brandished a grease pencil, and wrote on the bedroom door "The Candlelight Killer Strikes Again", and nearby also wrote "Catch Me If You Can". Liberty and Bierly then left the apartment, leaving Greytak behind. After seven hours, Greytak was able to loosen the rope that had been used to bound him, set himself free, and called the police. Following this, a manhunt ensued.

== Capture ==
Investigators in various cities in Orange County checked bars and other placing Liberty was known to frequent. By that time, Liberty fled out of state. On June 9, Liberty along with Bierly and Glenn Alan Fawcett, 17, robbed a motel in Colorado Springs, Colorado of $109, and kidnapped the owner's wife. The owner called police, whom located Liberty's vehicle, found the kidnapped woman, and arrested him along with Bierly and Fawcett.

Liberty pleaded not guilty by reason of insanity. Before he could be brought to trial, on January 20, 1971, Liberty, along with his cellmate Paul Eugene Rankin, were strangled to death by another cellmate Timothy Earl Dudley, 24. Dudley was sentenced to life imprisonment after pleading guilty in April.

== See also ==
- List of serial killers in the United States
