= Francisco Antonio Laureana =

Argentine serial killer

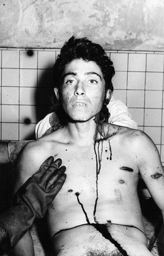
- Image from the autopsy performed on Laureana, 1975
- Born: 1954; Corrientes, Argentina
- Died: February 27, 1975 (aged 20–21); San Isidro, Argentina
- Cause of death: Killed in a shootout with the police
- Other name: "The Satyr of San Isidro"

Details
- Victims: 13+
- Span of crimes: 1974–1975
- Country: Argentina
- State: Buenos Aires

Francisco Antonio Laureana (1954 – February 27, 1975) was a young Argentine man killed by the Buenos Aires police, who believed him to be a rapist and serial killer called The Satyr of San Isidro, who for a period of six months—from 1974 and 1975—raped women, 13 of whom he murdered. He killed most of his victims on Wednesdays and Thursdays near 6:00 p.m.

== Crimes ==
The police reconstructed the events based on what they believed to be a series of murders and the psychological profile of the murderer. Francisco Laureana, 22, had been an intern in a Catholic school in the city of Corrientes in northern Argentina. The police claimed that Laureana had fled Corrientes because he had raped and hanged a nun from the stairs of the school. In July 1974, he moved to the city of San Isidro (in the north of the Greater Buenos Aires), where he worked as an artisan selling hoops, bracelets and necklaces. He married a woman who had three children.

Before going to work, he would say to his wife: "Do not let the kids outside because there are many degenerates."

Almost every Wednesday and Thursday, about 6 o'clock in the evening, a woman or girl disappeared in the city. Their bodies were found shortly afterward in vacant lots, with signs of having been raped and killed savagely. Some victims were strangled and others shot with a .32 caliber revolver. The victims were mainly women who sunbathed in nearby villas or who waited at bus stops. The "satyr" always stole something from his victims, such as rings, bracelets, chains, etc., which he kept as trophies in a boot at home. Sometimes he would return to the crime scene weeks later to relive the experience.

Due to the repeated modus operandi, police and forensics expert Osvaldo Raffo believed that the deaths could be the work of a single individual.

After committing one of his homicides, a witness saw the perpetrator fleeing on the roof of a house, but he was shot at with a gun. Said witness was unharmed and was key to making an identikit of the suspect that began to circulate around the city.

== Death ==
On Thursday, February 27, 1975, an eight-year-old girl saw Francisco Laureana and thought he looked like the serial killer. After telling her mother, the woman pretended to call her husband but notified the authorities. Laureana passed by, smiled, and continued on.

The police found him a few blocks away and because his characteristics were similar to the identikit's, they approached the suspect, asking him to accompany them for an interrogation. According to the police report, Laureana then took a gun from his shoulder bag and started firing at the officers, initiating a shootout in which he was shot in the shoulder. The badly injured Laureana escaped, hiding from the police in a chicken coop near a mansion. However, a dog "marked" Laureana's hiding place to its owner, prompting the police to approach the coop and pepper Laureana with bullets.

The authorities regretted killing him, as they wanted to interrogate him about his motives for committing murders. Two hens were found dead in the coop (it is unknown if the police or Laureana with his violent urges killed them). When his wife was informed, she said that "There must have been a mistake. My husband could not have done all that. He was a good father, a good husband, and a craftsman who loved what he did."

As the killer was a fetishist, many of his crimes were solved when the police found the boot in which the victims' items were stashed, along with firearms.

The case of Francisco Antonio Laureana, one of the most prolific murderers in Argentine history, went relatively unnoticed due to the complex political climate during the government of Isabel Perón, which led to open confrontation with the guerrilla group Montoneros, to the Operation Independence and eventually to the 1976 military coup.

== Suspected victims ==
Argentine justice claims Laureana murdered at least 13 women, but he is also the prime suspect in many other unsolved murders.

=== "The Satyr of Corrientes" case ===
Between 1973 and 1974, a series of rapes and murders of women occurred in the city of Corrientes, where Laureana was originally from. The suspect was nicknamed "The Satyr of Corrientes." There were at least three murders.

A young man named Horacio Di Montova was tried and convicted for one of the murders. In later years, his guilt has been questioned. Some criminologists believe that Francisco Laureana was responsible, since the killer had a similar modus operandi, and the rapes and murders stopped after he left the city.

=== Murder of Ana Maria Rivarola ===
On September 24, 1974, an 8-year-old girl named Ana María Rivarola was abused and strangled to death inside the San Marcelo school in Don Torcuato, northern Buenos Aires province.. The murderer was never found.

Laureana was one of the many people the police investigated as a possible suspect, since the murder occurred a few months after her arrival in the city.

=== "The Cannibal of San Isidro" case ===
In 1972, a series of unsolved murders occurred in the city of San Isidro. At least five women were raped and strangled to death. All victims were blondes and the killer bit off body parts. The press dubbed him as "The Cannibal of San Isidro."

Criminal expert Osvaldo Raffo performed autopsies on the victims. It was reported that 24 suspects were ruled out as the killer because their teeth did not match those obtained from the bite marks on the bodies.

Prior to Laureana's death, the press believed that the Cannibal of San Isidro and the Satyr of San Isidro were the same killer. This theory was never confirmed, and is strongly believed to be incorrect, as Laureana never cut off body parts from his victims. Furthermore, there is no evidence that Laureana ever visited the city before he moved there in 1974. However, many modern sources still refer to him as The Cannibal.

Laureana had family in San Isidro before he moved there in 1974, so it is suspected that, if he was the Cannibal, he may have committed the murders during visits to his relatives.

== See also ==
- List of serial killers by country
- List of serial killers by number of victims
