= Gabriel Garza Hoth =

Mexican serial killer

- Born: Gabriel Garza Hoth; Mexico
- Other name: The Black Widower

Details
- Victims: 3
- Span of crimes: 1991–1998
- Country: Mexico

Gabriel Arturo Garza Hoth also known as "The Black Widower", was a Mexican serial killer active between 1991 and 1998 in Mexico City. He collected life insurance payments on his wife and lovers, gaining a total of 500,000 dollars.

His first victim was his first wife, named Soledad Valdez, who had a heart attack and died in 1991, but the doctors believed that maybe she had been poisoned. His second victim was his girlfriend named Marcela Palacios, who died in 1992 in a "violent assault". The final victim was Ana Gloria Gomezpalacio who died in another "assault". The coincidences were alerted to the police, but Garza escaped to Spain. He was captured in 1998 and extradited to Mexico, where he was condemned to life in prison.

== See also ==
- List of serial killers by country
