= Nicolai Bonner =

Convicted Moldovan-Israeli serial killer

- ניקולאי בונר
- Born: 1972 (age 53–54); Moldavian SSR
- Other name: "The Haifa Homeless Killer"
- Convictions: Murder (4 counts); Obstruction of justice (3 counts)
- Penalty: Life imprisonment

Details
- Victims: 4
- Span of crimes: 9 February – 1 May 2005
- Country: Israel
- State: Haifa
- Date apprehended: 29 May 2005

Nicolai Bonner (Hebrew: ניקולאי בונר; born 1972), known as The Haifa Homeless Killer (Hebrew: רוצח ההומלסים), is a Moldovan-born Israeli serial killer who killed four people in Haifa between February and May 2005. For these crimes, he was sentenced to life imprisonment.

== Early life ==
Nicolai Bonner was born in a village in the Moldavian SSR in 1972, the third of four children. His mother was busy working at a factory, while his father was an alcoholic who paid little attention to his children. At the age of 9, Bonner's mother died, and he was sent to a boarding school to complete his education.

While at the boarding school, Bonner began to drink vodka to ease his feelings of loneliness. After graduating, he returned to live in his parental home and began working as a shepherd on a local farm, but quit after some time, opting to work menial jobs in Ukraine and Russia to earn an income. A year into his travels, he was convicted of theft and sentenced to a year-long incarceration. When he served it out, Bonner returned to Moldova, where he soon met and married an 18-year-old girl. In 2000, the couple decided to immigrate to Israel; while Bonner wasn't Jewish, he was still eligible via the Law of Return as his wife was. They moved into a rented apartment in Haifa, with Bonner taking on jobs in the construction industry, most notably spending two years as a pipeline manufacturing plant in Acre. According to his employer, Yossi Ben-David, Bonner was considered a diligent and respectful worker who performed his tasks without any complaints.

In January 2003, his wife died suddenly from tuberculosis, causing Bonner to indulge in alcoholism even further, which impacted his work performance. Eventually, he quit and began moving around the country in search of labour-intensive jobs, but eventually returned to Haifa and began living on the streets with the homeless. Over the following months, he befriended an older homeless man, Simon Ariri, and even found himself a new girlfriend, often visiting the former's house to drink vodka together. In September 2004, Bonner moved in with his sister in Tel Aviv, but after she was deported from the country, he moved to Emunim moshav, where he worked in construction. In December, he was fired from the job and then returned to Haifa.

== Murders ==
On 9 February 2005, Bonner offered to help escort 52-year-old Rita Wolman back to her apartment on Hussein Street. Wolman, a fellow immigrant and former bar singer who suffered a leg injury from a car crash, invited him for a drink in her apartment. The two drank and smoked until the late evening, with Wolman offering Bonner to stay over. Taking this as an offer for intimacy, the half-drunk Bonner asked Wolman to have sex, but she refused. Enraged, he slapped her twice, before Rita retaliated and slapped him back. At that point, Bonner hit her on the head and knocked Wolman unconscious, before he proceeded to rape her. After he finished, he noticed that she had stopped breathing, and in order to dispose of the evidence, he set her bed on fire with a lighter.

About a month later, on March 11, Bonner went to the home of 34-year-old Russian immigrant Alexander "The Chechen" Levant, a former soldier in the Russian Armed Forces who had fought in the Second Chechen War. The two men were acquainted from the nearby marketplace and were drinking buddies, but when Levant fell asleep, Bonner attempted to steal a bottle of alcohol. However, Levant awoke and warned him to leave it. In response, Bonner began beating him, killing his friend in the process. After he had killed Levant, he grabbed several matches and lit the corpse on fire.

In late April, Bonner wandered into an abandoned kindergarten on Gush Halav Street, which was notorious for being a gathering place for alcoholics and drug addicts. There, he met with 32-year-old Valeri Soznov, a fellow alcoholic with whom he started a fire to keep themselves warm. For unclear reasons, the pair began arguing, after which the drunken Bonner beat Soznov to death, kicking his body into the fire and then fleeing the scene.

On 1 May, Bonner was squatting in an abandoned apartment with another homeless immigrant, 39-year-old Alexander Kars, whom he had befriended the day before. While the pair were drinking, Kars made an off-hand comment about Bonner's mother, which insulted the latter. Noticing a large stick nearby, Bonner grabbed it and started hitting Kars, knocking him to the ground. After incapacitating him, he strangled Kars to death with a TV cable.

== Arrest, trial and imprisonment ==
Twelve days later, Bonner was walking on the streets in Haifa when he came across 42-year-old Sergei Bluestein, a fellow homeless man he had known for two years. To celebrate Bluestein's birthday, the two men went to the abandoned kindergarten to drink vodka, but in a drunken stupor, Bluestein asked Bonner whether he had ever stolen something from the marketplace. Suddenly, Bonner became enraged and started shouting that everybody hated him, stunning his friend. Before he could calm him down, Bonner severely beat Bluestein, strangling and stomping on him repeatedly. After he finished, believing that his friend had died, Bonner left. Bluestein survived his injuries, and on the next morning, he managed to drag himself onto the street, where he was found by passersby and transported to the nearest hospital.

Bluestein spent three days in the emergency room recovering from his injuries. After he was released, he unsuccessfully tried to find Bonner, whom he wanted to take revenge on. Instead, he was arrested as a potential suspect in the murder of Valeri Soznov, as he frequented the kindergarten where the latter was found dead. At the interrogation, Bluestein told the police about his violent drinking buddy, whom he knew only by the name 'Nicolai'. Deciding to look further into his claims, police officers dressed up as vagrants and mingled among the population to gather more information about the mysterious man. By doing this, they confirmed Bluestein's claims, as numerous of the homeless people repeatedly claimed that a violent man named Nicolai frequently torched buildings where they often drank alcohol. Eventually, his identity was revealed after authorities checked in with local hospitals - it turned out that a day after Rita Wolman's murder, a man named Nicolai Bonner had arrived at Rambam Hospital with a severe head injury.

Bonner wasn't arrested immediately, since the investigators had no evidence connecting him to any of the recent murders at the time. He was kept under surveillance until 29 May, when he was arrested at his mother-in-law's home and brought in for questioning. At the interrogation, Bonner confessed to all four of the murders, recalling what he was able to remember while committing them and why. When asked if he felt any remorse for the acts, he simply replied 'No.' and then burst into tears.

Shortly after his arrest, Bonner was brought to trial at Haifa District Court for the four murders, in addition to being charged with aggravated rape, three counts of arson and three counts of obstruction of justice. A few weeks into the proceedings, he recanted his confessions, claiming that the police officers had pressured him into signing them while he was drunk, and when he refused, they threatened to kill his daughter and girlfriend. This claim was supported by his attorney Ofer Cohen, who maintained that his client had been deceived into signing without being properly explained what the paper read, as he wasn't a fluent speaker of Hebrew; in addition, he was asked for a lesser sentence on the grounds of insanity, claiming that Bonner had been diagnosed with paranoid personality disorder by psychiatrists. This explanation was rejected by the judges, who subsequently convicted Bonner on almost all charges, only acquitting him of the aggravated rape. As a result, on 7 November 2007, he was handed down four life sentences (30 years minimum) for murder, five years for attempted murder, nine years for aggravated rape, and three years for additional charges, totalling 137 years, the harshest sentence ever delivered in a Haifa court to this day.

As of 2021, Bonner is still alive and remains behind bars.

== See also ==
- List of serial killers by country
