= Macario Alcalá Canchola =

Mexican serial killer

- Born: c. 1930; Mexico City, Mexico
- Other name: "Mexican Jack"
- Penalty: 60 years in prison, maximum penalty in this time in Mexico City.

Details
- Victims: 2–12+
- Span of crimes: 1960–1962
- Country: Mexico
- State: Mexico City
- Date apprehended: September 1962

Macario Alcalá Canchola (born c. 1930) is a Mexican suspected serial killer who is popularly known as Jack Mexicano.

From 1960 to 1962, Alcalá is believed to have killed women in Mexico City who were known to work as prostitutes in poor inner-city neighborhoods, possibly in an attempt to imitate the infamous serial killer Jack the Ripper. Despite only confessing to a single murder, Alcalá is also heavily suspected of committing the murders of at least eleven other women around Mexico City.

Alcalá was apprehended in September 1962 and sentenced to 60 years in prison, the maximum penalty at the time, for the murder of two women.

== Background ==
Born in the 1930s in Mexico City, Alcalá developed an inferiority complex. Alcalá entered into the Mexican Army, but was eventually dismissed for his incompetence and lack of discipline, and also tried to become a professional boxer but failed. Alcalá was known to have been married and had children, but had separated from his wife for unknown reasons.

== Murders ==
In 1960, the bodies of numerous female prostitutes began to appear in motel rooms in poor neighborhoods of Mexico City, and initially, the police didn't believe that the murders were related. On September 20, 1962, the body of Julia González Tejedas, a prostitute and mother of 4 children who worked in a local bar named El Imperial, was discovered in a room of a motel named Drigales in Colonia Guerrero. González was strangled in the room and there were no signs of struggle; her unclothed body was placed in a theatrical position on the bed.

With lipstick the killer wrote "Jak mexicano, reto a Cueto" on a mirror in the room, translating to "Challenge to Cueto. Mexican Jack" in English. "Cueto" was the surname of the Police Chief at the time and "Jak" was presumably a misspelling of Jack. Jack Mexicano (Spanish for "Mexican Jack" or "Jack the Mexican") became a popular name for the then-unknown murderer among the press and the Mexican public. The name was most likely chosen as a reference to the notorious British murderer Jack the Ripper, who was accused of murdering at least five women working as prostitutes in impoverished areas of 19th century London, but was ultimately never caught. Due to the similarities of the murderers and the possible reference to Jack the Ripper, it is generally considered that Alcala was a copycat killer.

== Arrest and conviction ==
After the discovery of the body of Julia González Tejedas, the police interrogated her bar partners and the Drigales motel staff. After obtaining a spoken portrait of the González's last client, they were eventually led to Alcalá and he was arrested days after. Alcalá confessed to the murder of González, but denied committing any of the other killings which he was accused of, which included around twelve women who had been murdered in Mexico City's poor neighborhoods in a similar fashion to González from 1960 to 1962. While only confessing to the individual murder, during interrogation, Alcalá made comments regarding the murders of the other women that contained only information the police would know and the media didn't know. This leak of information was successfully linked by the police to committing the killing of another woman in January 1962.

Macario Alcalá Canchola was sentenced to 60 years of prison, which was the maximum penalty at the time in Mexico City, for the 1962 murders of Julia González Tejedas and a second woman.

== Mental health ==
Alcalá's relatives and acquaintances had described him as frequently egotistical and frustrated. Due to the fact that he divulged information about his murders, regardless of whether he confessed to committing them or not, he was diagnosed with narcissistic personality disorder.

A criminologist working on the case made a psychiatric profile after Julia González's murder (translated from Spanish):

In a joint action in which judicial agents and technical investigators join forces to clarify this crime, it is possible to establish on the part of the psychologist Pablo García González, of the Institute of Criminal Investigation, a profile of Jack: He defines him as a successful exhibitionist.-The fact that the killer wrote the message about the moon on a mirror shows that he wants to be taken into account and that his crime transcends. The killer acted with serenity, which was proven by the fact that he took Julia's clothes; he also tried not to leave fingerprints... He is also a low-stratum individual, for he did not even know how to write Jack's name well... It is possible he will kill again.

— García González, Pablo from the "Instituto de Investigación Criminalística"; 1962

== See also ==
- List of serial killers by country
