= Diego Casanova =

Argentine serial killer

- Born: Diego Roberto Casanova Trigo; 1980 (age 45–46); Maipú, Mendoza Province, Argentina
- Other names: Gordo Picurú; The Prisoner Killer; El Tuerto
- Years active: 2004–2016
- Status: Incarcerated
- Conviction: Murder (x6)
- Penalty: Life sentence (x2)

Details
- Victims: 6
- Country: Argentina
- Date apprehended: October 14, 2004
- Imprisoned at: Boulogne Sur Mer prison

Diego Casanova (born 1980) is an Argentine serial killer who murdered six people between 2004 and 2016. Casanova is known as The Prisoner Killer as he murdered five inmates while imprisoned. Additionally, he participated in sixty-seven fights and several riots in prison. Experts describe Casanova as an extremely dangerous prisoner with psychopathic behavior, and one of the cruelest serial killers in Argentine history.

== Biography ==
In 1980, Diego Casanova was born in the city of Maipú, Argentina. Casanova began committing robberies at a young age, and became known in his neighborhood as "Gordo Picurú". In 2004, he was briefly arrested for robbery, but released a few weeks later.

In April of 2012, Casanova lost his left eye after another inmate stabbed it with a knife. This earned him the nickname "El Tuerto" ('The One Eyed'). Casanova's behavior behind bars is considered appalling by other inmates and prison staff. Experts have described him as psychopathic and antisocial, which is why he is being medicated with an anxiolytic.

== Victims ==
=== Francisco Quevedo ===
On October 14, 2004, Casanova and an accomplice planned to rob a home in Barrio México, Maipú. However, the owner of the house, 67-year-old Francisco Quevedo, woke up during the ordeal, so Casanova stabbed him to death. After murdering the man, Casanova and his accomplice placed his body on a couch, and put a blanket on Quevedo's lap to not arouse suspicion. However, a 12-year-old girl witnessed the murder and alerted the police. Later that day, Casanova was arrested and sentenced to 20 years in prison. He was then transferred to the Boulogne Sur Mer prison.

=== Diego Ferranti and Gerardo Gómez ===
Diego Ferranti and Gerardo Gómez were two inmates who participated in a riot at another prison. The two had agreed to testify and were transferred to the Boulogne Sur Mer prison for their own protection. On June 17, 2006, the day after Ferranti and Gómez arrived at the prison, Diego Casanova and three accomplices stabbed them to death and wrapped their bodies in sheets. The motive behind the murders is still unknown, but Casanova and the three accomplices were subsequently sentenced to life in prison.

=== José Manuel Cruz ===
On November 27, 2006, Casanova murdered José Manuel Cruz, another inmate. Cruz was serving a sentence for assault, and had been in the Boulogne Sur Mer prison for a month at the time of his death. While Cruz was sleeping, Casanova wrapped a sheet around him and stabbed him twenty times. Casanova then dragged his corpse to the door of a pavilion.

Casanova was sentenced to an additional twelve years in prison for Cruz's murder.

=== Darío Vega González ===
On April 24, 2010, Casanova and two other inmates started a prison riot. One of the collaborators faked having a seizure. Five prison guards opened his cell to try and help; but it was a ruse, and four inmates took the guards hostage. During the riot, Casanova killed 35-year-old Darío Vega González, who was serving time for sexual abuse. After the murder, Casanova and the others freed the guards and turned themselves in. Casanova stated that he wanted to attract attention so that he would be transferred to another prison. For the killing, Casanova received another life sentence.

=== Andrés Florentino Peñaloza ===
Andrés Peñaloza, 17, was serving a sentence for kidnapping and murder. At Peñaloza's own request, he was moved to the same cell as Casanova. Since Casanova was a feared prisoner, Peñaloza wanted to establish a friendship with him for security. Their coexistence lasted for forty-five days, until May 29, 2016, when Casanova bludgeoned Peñaloza to death with a makeshift crowbar. Casanova reportedly reacted indifferently to the murder he committed, caring more about if he would have visitors that day, and that his clothes had been ruined by Peñaloza's blood.

Since the murder of Peñaloza, Casanova has lived in solitary confinement.

== See also ==
- Crime in Argentina
- List of prison deaths
- List of serial killers by country
