= Atlanta Ripper =

Unidentified serial killer

Details
- Victims: 15–21
- Date: 1909 and 1914
- Country: United States

The Atlanta Ripper was an unidentified serial killer who is suspected of killing at least fifteen Atlanta women between 1911 and 1912.

== Background ==
On May 28, 1911, the body of Belle Walker, a cook, was found 25 yards from her home on Garibaldi Street in Atlanta by her sister after she failed to return home from work the previous night. Her throat had been cut by an unknown person, and the crime was reported in the Atlanta Constitution under the headline "Negro Woman Killed; No Clue to Slayer." Four weeks later, the body of another victim, Addie Watts, was also discovered with her throat slashed.

As news of the murders continued to spread, the black population of Atlanta were filled with terror. On July 3, after the eighth consecutive killing, The Baltimore Sun reported that news of the murders caused few black women to be on the streets at night and black service workers were refusing to go to work after dark.

News reports also noted the similarities of the victims in the case. By the end of 1911, fifteen women, all black or dark-skinned, all in their early 20s, had been murdered in the same manner. The victims were all described as "good looking" and "neatly dressed", with many of them having received an education. The murders were all described as having been committed with a knife or other sharp object, with their gruesomeness being of particular note. The murderer would rip, tear and mutilate the bodies of the victims after death. One victim, 40-year-old Lena Sharpe, was described as having had her head almost severed.

== Search for suspects ==
The search for the serial killer, named "the Atlanta Ripper" by the press, found six different suspects but no convictions were ever made, nor was the crime ever solved. The "Ripper" may have had as many as 21 victims, but there is no conclusive proof that the murders were carried out by one person.

The series of murders also drew attention to broader challenges within Atlanta's policing and social environment during the early 1910s. Newspapers at the time reported that residents in the affected neighborhoods expressed concern about the pace and coordination of the investigations. As the number of victims increased, both Black and White owned newspapers called for more organized investigative efforts, noting that investigative strategies often shifted from one suspect to another without producing clear evidence. Police officials publicly stated that they were pursuing multiple leads, but available records show that suspects were frequently arrested and later released when no substantive connections to the crimes could be established.

In addition to investigative difficulties, the surrounding community as well as local newspapers didn't give these murders the same level of attention in local newspapers as other cases at the time. Cases, such as the case of Daisy Grace, were covered more extensively in Atlanta newspapers than the Atlanta Ripper murders.

It was reported that the daughter of one of the victims, who was also attacked by an assailant and recovered, caught sight of the attacker. She described him as a large, black man who was powerfully built and neatly dressed.

== See also ==
- List of serial killers in the United States
- List of fugitives from justice who disappeared

== Cited works and further reading ==
- Blundell, Nigel (1998) [1997]. Encyclopedia of Serial Killers. PRC Publishing. ISBN 978-1-856-48328-5.
- Brown, Alan (2022). Georgia Legends & Lore. History Press. ISBN 978-1-467-15178-8.
- Newton, Michael (2004). The Encyclopedia of Unsolved Crimes. Facts on File. ISBN 978-0-816-07818-9.
- Underwood, Corinna (2009). Murder and Mystery in Atlanta. Arcadia Publishing. ISBN 978-1-614-23341-1.
- Wells, Jeffrey (2011). The Atlanta Ripper: The Unsolved Story of the Gate City's Most Infamous Murders. The History Pressg. ISBN 978-1-609-49381-3.
