= Charles Quansah =

Ghanaian serial killer

- Born: Charles Kwabena Ebo Quansah; 1964 (age 61–62); Ghana
- Other name: The Accra Strangler
- Penalty: Death

Details
- Victims: 9, possibly 34+
- Span of crimes: 1993–2000
- Country: Ghana
- States: Greater Accra Region, Accra
- Date apprehended: 2000

Charles "Papa" Kwabena Ebo Quansah (born 1964), known as The Accra Strangler, is a convicted Ghanaian serial killer who was arrested in February 2000 and convicted of the strangulation deaths of nine women.

Quansah was initially arrested in 2000 for the murder of his then-girlfriend Joyce Boateng. While in custody, Quansah was subsequently charged with the murder of another woman, Akua Serwaa, who was found strangled near Kumasi Sports Stadium in Kumasi on 19 January 1996, and subsequently confessed to the strangulation deaths of eight women in the capital city of Accra. The deaths of thirty-four women were attributed to a serial killer beginning in 1993.

Quansah, a mechanic who lived in the Accra, Ghana neighbourhood of Adenta, had been previously under police surveillance as a suspect in the killings.

Police and prison records reveal that Charles Quansah was jailed at the James Fort prisons for the offence of rape in 1986. After completing his sentence, he committed another rape and was jailed for three years at the Nsawam Prisons in 1987. Quansah was imprisoned again for robbery in 1996 at the Nsawam Medium Prisons near Accra, Ghana. After his release that year, he relocated to Accra.

Charles Quansah's trial for the serial killings began on Thursday, 11 July 2002 at the High Court Criminal Sessions, Accra. He was subsequently convicted of the strangulation deaths of nine women and sentenced to be hanged until death.

In 2003, Quansah spoke to the press and denied killing any of the nine women he was convicted of murdering or the further twenty-three women he was suspected of murdering and issued a statement proclaiming that he was tortured whilst in police custody.

== See also ==
- List of serial killers by country
- List of serial killers by number of victims

== External links/Sources ==
- Ghana Resource Center, Serial killer Arrested, May 16, 2001
- Ghana Resource Center, Serial Killer Speaks Out, August 20, 2003
- Ghana Homepage, General News of Friday, 12 July 2002
- Ghana Homepage, Review of Print Media, July 31, 2003
- Feminist.com: Women's News
- Ghana Homepage, General News of Wednesday, June 9, 2004
