= Yuri Ivanov (serial killer) =

Soviet serial killer

- Born: Yuri Anufrievich Ivanov; 14 February 1956; Ust-Kamenogorsk, Kazakh SSR, Soviet Union
- Died: 22 July 1989 (aged 33); Kazakh SSR, Soviet Union
- Cause of death: Execution by firing squad
- Other names: "The Ust-Kamenogorsk Maniac" "The Silk Factory Killer"
- Conviction: Murder
- Penalty: Death

Details
- Victims: 16
- Span of crimes: 1974–1987
- Country: Soviet Union
- State: East Kazakhstan
- Date apprehended: 1987

Yuri Anufrievich Ivanov (Russian: Ю́рий Ану́фриевич Ивано́в; 14 February 1956–22 July 1989), known as The Ust-Kamenogorsk Maniac, was a Soviet rapist and serial killer. Over the span of 13 years, he raped and killed 16 girls and women.

He committed his crimes in Ust-Kamenogorsk, in the area of the "Silk fabrics factory".

== Biography ==
Yuri Ivanov worked as a driver. He was married, and had a daughter. One day, he returned home from work and found his wife in bed with a lover. Ivanov then developed a hatred towards, and vowed to kill, women who cheat on their husbands. During the investigation, Ivanov stated that he spoke with many women, and asked about their opinions towards men. If the woman spoke poorly of her husband, or of men as a whole, he would kill her. He would rape, and then choke his victims to death. After the murder, he usually took some of the deceased's personal belongings.

He was eventually sentenced to three years in a penal colony for attempted rape. During this time, Ivanov worked as a driver, and had the opportunity to travel beyond the colony, allowing him to commit several more crimes.

From 1977 to 1987, Ivanov did not kill, and his personal life had seemingly improved. But, after he and his wife divorced in 1986, he returned to violent crime. In 1987, he killed a 16-year-old girl. At the crime scene, an aluminium button and a hair sample were found that did not belong to the victim. A trap was set up at the crime scene, and the next day, Yuri Ivanov returned and was arrested. Facing strong evidence against him (he had given two of his roommates' items belonging to his victims, gave the police a purse with his fingerprint, and his jacket that lacked an aluminium button). Ivanov confessed to the rape and murders of sixteen women and girls, and fourteen separate rapes. Ivanov perfectly remembered events that occurred many years ago to the slightest detail and directed police to all the crime scenes, almost without error. He said that he remembered the faces of all his victims, and to prove this, the investigators devised a unique experiment - "identification of the contrary": they showed him photos of different women, so he would determine which of them he had raped or killed. Ivanov identified the pictures of his victims without mistake.

For the murder of one of the women in 1974, the victim's husband was convicted. By that time he had served most of the term - 7 out of 12 years. The verdict against him was later abolished, the innocent man was compensated, and the murder was correctly imputed to Ivanov.

Yuri Ivanov himself requested the death penalty, and in 1989, he was sentenced to death. Before the execution, he asked to arrange a meeting with his daughter, but she refused. In 1989, Ivanov was executed by firing squad.

=== In the media ===
- Documentary film "The Involuntary Murderer" from the series "Legends of the Soviet Investigation".

== See also ==
- List of serial killers by country
- List of serial killers by number of victims
