= Aleksandr Berlizov =

Soviet serial killer

- Born: Aleksandr Ivanovich Berlizov; 12 October 1946; Tikhoretsk, Russian SFSR, Soviet Union
- Died: Summer 1974 (aged 27); Dnipropetrovsk, Ukrainian SSR, Soviet Union
- Cause of death: Execution by shooting
- Other name: The Night Demon
- Conviction: Murder
- Penalty: Death

Details
- Victims: 9
- Span of crimes: 1969–1973
- Country: Soviet Union
- State: Dnipropetrovsk

Aleksandr Ivanovich Berlizov (Russian: Александр Иванович Берлизов; 12 October 1946 – summer 1974) was a Soviet serial killer who operated in Tikhoretsk and Dnipropetrovsk. He was known as The Night Demon.

== Biography ==
Berlizov was born in Tikhoretsk, Russian SFSR and in 1970 was transferred to Dnipropetrovsk (Note: For these reasons sometimes Dnipropetrovsk is wrongly indicated as his birth place.) because of his new job at the Yuzhmash.

He attacked women only in the evening and at night, strangling them until they lost consciousness, and then raped them. He only killed them when they came to themselves during the rape and saw him. The maniac did not leave behind any traces, which put the best investigators in the city to a dead end. Unprecedented measures were taken, and 3,000 police officers were called into the city, combing all the suspicious places where somebody would hide, including cellars, attics and cottages. Berlizov, feeling an ambush, stopped committing crimes for a while. When the reinforcement left the city, he raped a new victim.

The city began to panic, and women were afraid to go out in the evening. The Deputy Minister of Internal Affairs of the Ukrainian SSR Vladimir Bondarenko even considered intervening, but decided not to. And soon the police got lucky, as one victim had managed to regain consciousness during the rape, but the perpetrator hadn't noticed. She remembered his face, and despite being unable to produce a facial composite, she claimed she would recognise him if she saw him. The Head Deputy of the Dnipropetrovsk Department of Internal Affairs, Anatoly Tokar, walked with the victim in various public places for a month, so that she could recognize him in the crowd. Eventually, she saw Berlizov in a tram. He managed to run away, but Tokar remembered him and made a sketch of his face.

Soon it was found out that the former secretary of the Komsomol organization worked in the district committee. Berlizov participated in the detachment, which helped the police catch him. He was aware of all the police plans, which shocked many. The investigator in the Berlizov case, Ivan Gladush, later reported:

The prosecutor refused to give the warrant for Berlizov's arrest categorically. He said that Yuzhmash is a strictly secret facility, there are proven people working there, and Berlizov can not be a criminal. What could we do? I ordered that the suspect be monitored.

The detectives noticed that Berlizov wore scarce imported footwear, traces of which coincided with those left at the scene of the crime scene. A search was carried out in the Berlizov's house, with victims' items, whom he had taken as trophies, were found. In addition, more items were found in his parents' house in Stavropol. He was soon arrested. He was recognized as sane, albeit a sexual psychopath. The court found him guilty of 9 murders and 42 rapes, sentenced him to death and executing him in the Dnipropetrovsk detention centre in summer 1974.

=== In popular culture ===
- The documentary film "The Night Demon" from the cycle "No time limit".

== See also ==
- List of serial killers by country
