= Werner Boost =

German serial killer

- Born: Werner Korecki; May 6, 1928 (age 98); Düsseldorf, Germany
- Other name: "The Couples Killer"
- Conviction: Murder
- Penalty: Life imprisonment

Details
- Victims: 1–5
- Span of crimes: 1953–1956
- Country: West Germany

Werner Boost (né Korecki; born 6 May 1928), nicknamed The Couples Killer, is a suspected German serial killer who allegedly committed double murders on couples in the 1950s. However, only one could be definitely proven - the murder of lawyer Bernd Servé in January 1953.

== Life ==
Werner Boost was born in 1928 under the name Werner Korecki and spent his childhood and youth in a Protestant orphanage in Düsseldorf-Kaiserswerth, where he was adopted. Later he was admitted to a care home after he stole 300 Reichsmark from his mother. Boost never met his father.

At the age of 16, after two discontinued apprenticeships, he was drafted into the Wehrmacht and shortly thereafter became an American prisoner of war. After the end of the war and a failed attempt to complete his baker's journeyman apprenticeship, Boost became a casual worker in the later East Germany; he also offered support to people trying to flee East Germany, effectively becoming an escape helper. For this, he was sentenced by the judiciary in the Soviet occupation zone to a three-week prison term.

In 1949, Boost married and moved the following year with his family, consisting of his wife and two daughters, to his mother's home in Düsseldorf, West Germany. During this time he was sentenced to several months imprisonment for theft, which he had committed together with his friend and later accomplice Franz Lorbach.

== Murders ==
In 1953, a three-year series of couple slayings began. The first victim was the lawyer Bernd Servé. Servé was in his car with his 18-year-old boyfriend Adolf Hüllencremer when they were attacked by two masked perpetrators. While Servé was shot in the head and killed, Hüllencremer feigned death, at the whispered suggestion of Boost's accomplice. The killers believed he was dead after a blow to the head, but in fact, he had been only slightly injured and could contact the police.

In November 1955, the police uncovered a sunken car from a gravel pit near Düsseldorf-Kalkum, where the bodies of 26-year-old Friedhelm Behre and his girlfriend Thea Kürmann were discovered - both robbed and killed, akin to the attack on Servé and Hüllencremer.

On 8 February 1956, police officers came across an empty vehicle while searching for two missing persons. Because numerous traces of blood were found inside, the surrounding area was searched extensively. The next day, in a haystack not far from the vehicle, the bodies of the missing 20-year-old secretary Hildegard Wassing and her date Peter Falkenberg were found.

== Arrest and trial ==
Four months later, Boost was arrested. A Revieroberjäger discovered him while he was watching a couple being intimate in their car in a grove near Düsseldorf. Although there was a chance to escape, Boost did not resist his arrest.

At the trial in June 1956, his former accomplice Lorbach testified against Boost. He confessed to the attack on Bernd Servé and his partner in 1953, stating that Boost had killed his victim by a targeted headshot. Because of this statement, Boost was tried for murder and convicted to life imprisonment.

The other murder charges - and another attempted murder of a couple in 1956, which was only prevented because the woman called on passers-by for help - were seen by the court as insufficient evidence to be proven.

The behaviour and actions of the rather unobtrusive defendant during the process were described as charismatic. Similarly, Lorbach, who was portrayed as Boost's personal instrument of bizarre fantasies in search of the perfect murder, described his relationship with Werner Boost as being under his "spell".

Lorbach was convicted as an accessory of aiding and abetting to six years imprisonment, taking his confession into account.

In July 1990, Werner Boost was released after 34 years of imprisonment from Schwerte Prison.

== See also ==
- List of German serial killers

== Literature ==
- Michael Newton: The Encyclopedia of Serial Killers. 5th Edition, Leopold Stocker Verlag, Graz 2009, ISBN 978-3-85365-240-4
- Stephan Harbort: The Couples' Killer. Droste Verlag, Düsseldorf 2005, ISBN 3-7700-1190-2
