= Amir Qayyum =

Pakistani serial killer

- Born: Amir Qayyum; 1981 (age 44–45); Pakistan
- Other name: The Brick Killer
- Conviction: Murder (14 counts)
- Penalty: Death

Details
- Victims: 14
- Span of crimes: June – July 2005
- Country: Pakistan
- State: Lahore
- Date apprehended: 18 July 2005

Amir Qayyum (Urdu: عامر قیوم; born 1981) was a Pakistani serial killer who killed 14 homeless men in Lahore, Pakistan.

== Biography ==
Amir Qayyum was born in 1981 in Pakistan. As a child, Qayyum was abandoned by his father and went to live with his uncle, a Dr. Shahid. Qayyum displayed violent tendencies at a young age and was expelled from school. He was also thrown out of his house by his brothers and sisters after he would beat them up. On 25 September 2003, Shahid and a friend were murdered by unidentified assailants. On 28 February 2004, a suspect named Hafiz Abid was arrested but allegedly shot and killed himself in a police van after taking a gun from a sleeping policeman. His uncle's murder caused Qayyum to want to take revenge against society. From June to July 2005, Amir Qayyum killed 14 homeless men with bricks or stones and was known as "The brick killer". He was caught after assaulting a man with a stone. He was sentenced to death on 10 May 2006.

== See also ==
- List of serial killers by country
- List of serial killers by number of victims
