= Roger Andermatt =

Swiss serial killer (born 1969)

- Born: 1969 (age 56–57); Lucerne, Switzerland
- Other name: The Death-Keeper of Lucerne
- Conviction: Murder
- Penalty: Life imprisonment

Details
- Victims: 22
- Span of crimes: 1995–2001
- Country: Switzerland

Roger Andermatt (born 1969), known as The Death-Keeper of Lucerne, is a Swiss serial killer. With 22 claimed victims between 1995 and 2001, he is the most prolific serial killer in Swiss criminal history.

== Life ==
Andermatt worked as a nurse in various retirement homes in central Switzerland, including the Eichhof retirement home in Lucerne. All his victims were in need of care. The murders were noticed by an accumulation of deaths in certain homes. The victims in question's bodies were exhumed and autopsied in 2001. Andermatt was also known as a dance teacher and a DJ by the name "R.O-Gee".

Andermatt was convicted on 28 January 2005, by the Lucerne Criminal Court for murder in 22 cases, attempted murder in three cases and unfinished murder in two cases with resignation and life imprisonment. Thus, the court's punishment was above the prosecutor's request, and, in particular, did not follow the line of defense (killing out of sympathy).

On 15 February 2006, the sentence was upheld at a second hearing. The Lucerne High Court convicted Andermatt but only in seven murder cases. The remaining 15 cases were classified as deliberate killings. There are also three completed and two unfinished killing attempts. Owing to the high number of victims, the court decided to sentence Andermatt to life imprisonment.

Andermatt confessed to the murders, but claims to have acted out of compassion. He also complained that he and the nursing team had been overwhelmed.

== See also ==
- List of serial killers by country
- List of serial killers by number of victims
