= Atlanta Lover's Lane Murders =

Unidentified American serial killer

Details
- Victims: 3 dead, 3 wounded
- Span of crimes: January 16 – March 12, 1977
- Country: United States
- State: Georgia
- Date apprehended: Never apprehended

The Atlanta Lover's Lane Murders were a series of unsolved shooting attacks on three different couples in Atlanta, Georgia, in early 1977, which left three dead and three others injured. The same gun, a .38 caliber pistol, was used in all three shootings, which suggested that a single perpetrator was responsible for all three attacks. However, no suspect has ever been identified.

== Shootings ==
=== Murder of LaBrian Lovett and Veronica Hill ===
At around 1:00am on January 16, 1977, an out of control car drove full speed into an intersection and hit a street sign in Atlanta, Georgia. Police were called after witnesses noticed the car occupants were not coming out. They searched inside where they found 26-year-old LaBrian Lovett and 25 -year-old Veronica Hill naked with gunshot wounds. Hill was in the backseat of the car under a coat. Lovett's wounds were in the head, stomach, right leg, and left arm. Hill's wounds were in the left leg and her abdomen. Both were still alive when found and they were rushed to the hospital, where both died of their wounds. During the investigation, it was noted that the couple were seen heading to Adams Park, a notorious hang out spot for couples to be involved in sexual intercourse. Based on this, it was determined that the two had been engaged in sexual intercourse at Adams Park, when an unknown individual walked up and opened fire through the front window screen of the car. Lovett attempted to drive for help, but his injuries overtook him and caused him to lose control of the car. The bullets were tested and it was determined the gun used by the killer was a .38 caliber pistol.

=== Attack on Dennis Langston and Deitira Tatum ===
At around 2:00am on February 12, 1977, 18-year-old Dennis Langston and 17-year-old Deitira Tatum were having sex in a parked car in West Manor Park when an unknown individual approached the passenger window and fired six shots. One of the bullets hit Dennis and another hit Deitira. Both teens were still alive but were seriously injured, and they were rushed to the hospital. Dennis and Deitira would later make a full recovery. The teens said they got a quick look at the shooter, but were only able to identify him as a tall black male. The bullets the perpetrator fired were tested and it was determined that they came from the same gun that killed LaBrian Lovett and Veronica Hill a month earlier.

=== Murder of Diane Collins ===
On March 12, 1977, 20-year-old Diane Collins was with her fiancé in Adams Park. They had seen a movie earlier that evening and were closing out their date there. The couple did not see the gunman as he drew near their vehicle. The attacker fired six rounds through the passenger side window, killing Collins. Her fiancé was wounded in the head, but survived. After the attack, he managed to drive the car to his home, where he phoned for an ambulance.

== Investigation ==
It was not until late March when police revealed to the public that the three shootings were linked. The same gun was used in all three, and the modus operandi was the same. During the investigation, detectives noticed a pattern in the dates of the shootings. They theorized the killer was following a three-week schedule, as the second shooting occurred 26 days after the first shooting, and the third shooting occurred 28 days after the second one. They thought that if the killer was following the three-week schedule, then he would strike between the 6 and 8 of April. Between those days, undercover cops scoped out Adams Park and West Manor Park, waiting for the killer to strike. However, the killer failed to appear on either the 6th, 7th or 8th. In fact, the killer is not believed to have ever struck again. Nevertheless, police still investigated the murders, until attention was diverted to the Atlanta Child Murders, and they started spending more time focusing on that. By 1980 police said the investigation into the Lover's Lane shootings had come to a dead end, with no new suspects having been identified. Over the following 40+ years, the case has sat cold.

== See also ==
- Atlanta Child Murders
- Mineral, Washington murders

General:

- List of serial killers in the United States
