= Olaf Däter =

- Born: Olaf Däter; 25 September 1969 (age 57); Bremerhaven, West Germany
- Other name: "The Granny Killer"
- Conviction: Murder
- Penalty: Life imprisonment

Details
- Victims: 5
- Span of crimes: June 2001 –
- Country: Germany

Olaf Däter (born 25 September 1969 in Bremerhaven) is a German spree killer who has been dubbed as Oma-Mörder ("Granny-Killer") by the media.

== Life ==
Däter was born as an illegitimate child, and was adopted by his stepfather after a year after his birth. He grew up as an only child. Until his arrest, he kept close contact with his parents, who financially supported him in frequent emergencies. At the time of the murders, he lived in their immediate neighborhood.

Däter finished his school education with a Mittlere Reife and then committed himself to futile application attempts as a gerontological nurse for eight years in the Bundeswehr. There he reported to a medical unit and held the position of Oberfeldwebel until the end of his military career. Subordinate soldiers described him as bossy and meticulous with his orders. Following his military career, the German Armed Forces in Cuxhaven enabled him to become a nurse. Däter married after serving, but the marriage ended in divorce a year later.

== Murders ==
At the time of the murders Däter was indebted, because he had a taste for luxurious cars. He had also become friends with a prostitute shortly before the murder series, whom he tried to impress with his costly lifestyle.

In June 2001, the killer was arrested by the police in front of his parents' home in Bremerhaven. He had previously murdered five elderly women within ten days an subsequently robbed several of his victims. The sixth attacked victim survived only because Däter misinterpreted her fainting as a completed murder.

When the son of the woman called her, Däter was still in the victim's house. He picked up the phone and immediately hung up. After the suspicious son had found his unconscious mother shortly after the crime and the woman had woken up, the police were notified. She managed to name her attacker. After his arrest, it turned out that Däter had already murdered another elderly lady the same day. After these two acts, he invited his girlfriend and her child to a private flight over to the East Frisian Islands and Heligoland using the stolen money. On his return, the police were already waiting for him, because they suspected him of murder. The four previous victims were discovered only after Däter's confession, because the doctors had previously recognized their deaths as natural.

Däter had previously worked with his later victims as a geriatric nurse and thus enjoyed their confidence, thereby allowing him access to the crime scenes without resistance. Immediately before the start of the murder series, Däter was fired by his employers as a nurse for embezzlement of patients' funds without notice. His previous job in Cuxhaven had been terminated for the same reason, but his criminal record had been concealed, even to those in senior positions.

After he entered the apartments of his former patients, he attacked the defenseless women from behind and suffocated them. In these acts, he put his full body weight on the victims by kneeling on them, causing severe internal injuries to the elderly victims. The signs of these acts were overlooked by the coroners and the family doctors, so after the investigation into the murders, an intense discussion on undiscovered murders took place and many areas in and around Bremerhaven did further checks into the deaths of elderly people. Although the murders were planned as robberies, Däter left some crime scenes without victims, since he had been disturbed by the presence of nearby nurses. During robberies Däter only stole cash, leaving jewelry and other valuables untouched.

== Trial ==
After Däter's confessions, he was sentenced by the Landgericht Bremen to life imprisonment. The court noted the particular severity of the guilt, because of malice aforethought. As a motive for his actions he claimed money shortages, as his debts were in five digits at the time of the murders. During the police interrogation, he asserted that he would have continued the murder series if he had not been arrested.

== In the media ==
The case of Olaf Däter was featured in the episode "The Granny Killer from the Die großen Kriminalfälle series, produced by ARD.
