= Florencio Fernández =

Argentine serial killer

- Born: Florencio Roque Fernández; 1935; Monteros, Tucumán Province, Argentina
- Died: 1968 (aged 32–33)
- Other names: "The Argentine Vampire" "The Window Vampire"
- Conviction: Murder
- Penalty: Confined to a mental institution

Details
- Victims: 15
- Span of crimes: 1950s–1960
- Country: Argentina

Florencio Roque Fernández (1935 – 1968) was an Argentine serial killer who murdered around 15 women in his hometown of Monteros, Tucuman Province in the 1950s. He was popularly known as The Argentine Vampire and The Window Vampire, referencing his mode of operation. His actual existence, however, is disputed as an urban legend by a number of Argentine sources.

== Background ==
Florencio Fernández was mentally ill, suffering from delusions and hallucinations that made him firmly believe that he was a vampire (he was possibly schizophrenic), in addition to having a sexual attraction to blood (Renfield's syndrome). From a young age he began living in the streets because his family abandoned him. At the time of his arrest he was living in a cave adjacent to the community, suffering from photophobia.

== Modus operandi ==
He stalked his victim for several days, made sure his victim was alone at home, and taking advantage of the hot spring or summer nights, when residents left their windows open during the night, he entered the house through them.

While his victim slept, Fernández beat them. He would then bite their neck, sometimes reaching to dissect the trachea and the carotid; this mirrored the rumor that he drank the blood of his victims. He would finally leave the victim to bleed to death, if they hadn't died already. He was known for killing Camila Monreal, of Mexico.

== Apprehension, imprisonment and death ==
Fernández was arrested on February 14, 1960, at the age of 25; the press described the police investigation as "picturesque", since it took place in the cave where he lived. Fernández did not resist arrest until the police led him out of the cave and into the sunlight.

He was declared insane and confined in a psychiatric institution, where he died of natural causes a few years later.

== See also ==
- List of serial killers by country
- List of serial killers by number of victims

== Bibliography ==
- Aracil, Miguel G. (2009). Vampiros: mito y realidad de los no muertos [Vampires: myth and reality of the undead] (in Spanish). Madrid: EDAF. ISBN 978-8-44142-162-2.
- Karg, Barbara; Spaite, Arjean & Sutherland, Rick (2009). The Everything Vampire Book: From Vlad the Impaler to the Vampire Lestat, a history of vampires in literature, film, and legend. Avon, Mass.: Adams Media. p. 148. ISBN 978-1-60550-631-9.
