= Mohammed Adam Omar =

Sudanese murderer and suspected serial killer

- Born: Mohammed Adam Omar Ishaak; 1952; Sudan
- Died: June 20, 2001 (aged 48–49); Sana'a, Yemen
- Cause of death: Execution by firing squad
- Other names: "The Sana'a Ripper"; John Adam
- Conviction: Murder
- Penalty: Death

Details
- Victims: 2–51
- Span of crimes: 1995 – 1999 (possibly from 1975)
- Country: Yemen, others alleged
- State: Sana'a
- Date apprehended: May 2000

Mohammed Adam Omar Ishaak (Note: Different spellings of the name have been recorded) (1952 – June 20, 2001), known as The Sana'a Ripper, was a Sudanese murderer and alleged serial killer. A morgue assistant, Omar was convicted of killing two medical students in Yemen's Sana'a University and later executed for their murders. He additionally claimed another 49 victims across several countries in the Arab world before retracting his statements, prompting various theories whether he was truly responsible for the crimes he confessed to.

== Early life ==
Scant details are available about Omar's life. He was born in Sudan, and at the age of seven, he witnessed his father murder his mother's lover, as punishment for her adultery. He would later claim that this event led him to never trust women. Later in life, he married a Sudanese woman with whom he had two children, but later divorced her. His employment history record is also dubious, as it was initially claimed that he had been a mortuary assistant across many countries around Africa and the Middle East, but a letter from the Sudanese Ministry of Interior rebuked this: in it, it was revealed that Omar never worked in that field, and had instead been employed as a watchman, cleaner and gravedigger at a cemetery in Khartoum. Omar himself also claimed to have been a former boxing champion, but this was never proven either. Nonetheless, after his divorce, he married a Yemeni woman and moved to Sana'a, where he received his job as a morgue assistant at Sana'a University.

== Murders, trial and execution ==
In May 1999, the bodies of 21 female students were found buried either on campus or in the sewage system of Sana'a University. Omar was arrested in May 2000, on suspicion of killing 16 of them, whereupon he tried to commit suicide by cutting his wrists with his spectacles, but was overwhelmed. Just a day after being detained, he confessed to raping, killing and mutilating five women, citing his inability to "resist their beauty" and desire to send them to Heaven as his motive. Much to the investigators' horror, he went on to confess the murders of 51 women, with additional victims in his native Sudan, Kuwait, Chad, Lebanon, Jordan and the Central African Republic, starting in 1975. He explained that he lured the women, who were mostly medical students, to the morgue, under the guise of helping with their studies. In there, he killed them with a blow to the head. After that, he cut off the hands and feet, dissolved the bodies in chemicals and kept the bones as mementos, but categorically denied having sold any lasting body parts. Stealing gold from the victims was also given as a side motive.

The news spread among the tabloid press, who coined the nickname "The Sana'a Ripper" for Mohammed. Omar expressed his desire to be punished for his crimes, saying that he wouldn't be able to control himself if let go, even denying an attorney for his trial. At said trial, it was alleged by the prosecutor that Omar had been aided by a female Yemeni accomplice, whom he later murdered as well. However, inconsistencies began to appear in his story: one of them being the surprising appearance of a woman whom Omar claimed he'd killed. He then retracted his confession twice: on the first occasion, he denied the murders in other countries and admitted only 16 murders in Yemen; and on the second, he discarded the first admission, only admitting two murders: those of nursing students Hosn Ahmad Attiya (Yemeni, killed in 1995) and Zainab Saud Aziz (Iraqi, killed in December 1999). In the end, he was sentenced to death for the murders of Attiya and Aziz, and was to be put to death in front of the Sana'a University, in front of thousands of onlookers.

On June 20, 2001, after receiving 80 lashes for drinking alcohol, which is prohibited by Sharia law, Omar was executed by firing squad with five shots to the heart, but as he was still moving, one final to the head. The execution was seen by family members of the victims, but policemen prevented any recording of the event. Afterwards, Mohammed's body was taken away by ambulance, and buried in an undisclosed location.

== Controversies ==
Due to the sensational nature of the case, doubts have been expressed regarding many aspects, with various allegations regarding Mohammed's other killings, his guilt, and even his death.

=== Mossad agent ===
One of the officers working on the case, Col. Sawadah Omar Al Ayashi, told Gulf News reporters that Adam was an agent for Mossad, Israel's national intelligence agency, since the 1970s. According to Ayashi, he had entered Yemen on numerous occasions and was even imprisoned for six months in the mid-1970s, before being deported, later entering South Yemen in 1984 in order to spy on Palestinian military camps stationed there. In addition, Ayashi claimed that Omar had infiltrated Fateh-Intifada, a Palestinian splinter faction based in Damascus, spying on their operations in Lebanon during the 1980s, before moving to Jordan. Some policemen also said that they had confiscated several fake passports belonging to Mohammed Adam Omar, one of them presenting him as a Jordanian national named "John Adam".

Perhaps most surprisingly, Ayashi claimed that Omar's arrival at Sana'a University had been "arranged" by a fellow Sudanese professor, who by then had moved to Sharjah, in the United Arab Emirates. That professor apparently convinced the medical faculty of Mohammed's exceptional ability of conducting autopsies and decades of experience, allowing him to enter easily.

=== Feign death ===
The family of Zainab Saud Aziz, one of the girls Omar was convicted of killing, were so furious with the decision of the Yemeni government to not postpone the execution of their family member's killer so they could witness it, that they publicly stated their disbelief of his execution. The mother, Karimah Motlak, stated that a request to put a phone next to Omar's head so she could recognize his voice, as well as a photo of the body after the execution, was denied. Coupled with the fact that they were refused knowledge of where he would be buried, this made them suspect that another man had suffered his fate. The uncle, Hassan Sabeeh Motlak, expressed his belief that an officer from the Sudan Liberation Army, one Romil Jonet So, was the actual person executed by authorities.

=== Scapegoat ===
After the execution, rumors spread across Sana'a, particularly in the bazaars, that Mohammed Adam Omar had been nothing but a simple scapegoat for a wider sex-and-murder scandal, involving figures from the high society. The most widespread one was that the morgue housing the women's bodies collected them from exclusive brothels in Sana'a, which often have high-level client protection, a practice well known across the Middle East. The government under Ali Abdullah Saleh vigorously denied that anything was amiss with the trial, constantly pointing towards the fact that Omar had pleaded guilty at trial.

According to Omar's attorney, Mohammed Ali al-Khatib, he was allowed very little alone time with his client, away from police and prosecutors, only managing to get five to six minutes together. Mohammed Adam was about to present a different account of the events, when agents from the shadowy organization known as the Political Security Agency burst in, and abruptly ended the interview. That was the last time al-Khatib got to talk to Omar, and he expressed his view that one day the truth will be revealed, showing that Mohammed Adam Omar had never killed anybody.

== See also ==
- List of serial killers by country
