= February 9 Killer =

Mexican-born murderer (born 1980)

- Born: Juan Antonio Arreola-Murillo; October 7, 1980 (age 45); Mexico
- Conviction: Aggravated murder (3 counts)
- Penalty: 60 years to life in prison

Details
- Victims: 3+
- Span of crimes: February 9, 2006 – February 9, 2008
- Country: United States
- State: Utah
- Date apprehended: November 2018
- Imprisoned at: Utah State Correctional Facility

Juan Antonio Arreola-Murillo (born October 7, 1980), also known as the February 9 Killer, is a murderer responsible for the killing of two Salt Lake County, Utah women across the span of two years. In 2006, Arreola-Murillo murdered Sonia Mejia and her unborn baby. Two years later, he murdered Damiana Castillo. Both murders were committed on the same day, February 9, hence the nickname.

== Investigation ==
In 2009, the unsolved murders of Sonia Mejia in Taylorsville and Damiana Castillo in West Valley City were linked through DNA analysis. The corresponding police departments concurrently released a description of the perpetrator as a Hispanic male in his late teens or early 20s. A 20-man task force was then formed to find the killer. In 2012, the case was classified as a cold case.

In November 2018, Salt Lake County District Attorney Sim Gill announced that a suspect for the murders was in custody in another jurisdiction and was in the process of being extradited back to Utah to face charges. In January 2022, the charging documents were unsealed and revealed the suspect to be 41-year-old Mexican national Juan Arreola-Murillo, who had previous convictions for fraud in 2008 and was later deported to his homeland, where he remained until his extradition. Arreola was quickly extradited after prosecutors said they would not seek a death sentence in the case.

In June 2023, Arreola pleaded guilty to three counts of aggravated murder. His sentencing occurred in August of the same year, where he was sentenced to 20 years in prison, to be served for the 3 cases one after the other, for a total of 60 years to life in prison.

== Victims ==
- Sonia Mejia, aged 29, was raped and strangled in her apartment in Taylorsville. Her unborn child died with her.
- Damiana Castillo, aged 57, was strangled in her apartment in West Valley City.

== See also ==
- List of fugitives from justice who disappeared
