= Nikolai Shestakov =

Soviet serial killer and rapist

- Born: Nikolai Porfirievich Shestakov; 1954; RSFSR
- Died: 1978 (aged 23–24); RSFSR
- Cause of death: Execution by shooting
- Other name: "The Luberetsky Maniac"
- Conviction: Murder with aggravating circumstances
- Penalty: Death

Details
- Victims: 12
- Span of crimes: 1975–1976
- Country: Soviet Union
- State: Moscow
- Date apprehended: 12 March 1976

Nikolai Porfirievich Shestakov (Russian: Никола́й Порфи́рьевич Шестако́в; 1954–1978), known as The Luberetsky Maniac (Russian: Люберецкий маньяк), was a Soviet serial killer and rapist who worked as a truck driver.

== Biography ==
In 1975, he killed 12 girls and women, attempting to kill four others as well. All the victims were raped and killed at bus stops, being struck in the head with a heavy metal object, most often a sledgehammer. Shestakov, who was in a drunken state, then stole their valuables and threw their corpses into garbage dumps. He also had two accomplices: Andrei Vladimirovich Shuvalov (born 1957), who was arrested in November 1975, and his then 16-year-old brother Vladimir (5 December 1959 – 18 April 2011). Most of his crimes were committed in the Lyuberetsky District of the Moscow Oblast, with some murders occurring in the Balashikhinsky District.

On 12 March 1976, Shestakov was arrested by operatives while planning to commit another crime. During his detention, a sledgehammer was confiscated from him. On his clothes and in the cabin of his truck, blood samples from the victims were found. During the convoy for the trial, he managed to break out and escape but was soon detained in an acquaintance's apartment.

A psychiatric examination found him sane. He was diagnosed with psychopathy. During the trial, Shestakov and his accomplices could hardly save themselves from a public lynching. In 1977, the court sentenced Nikolai Shestakov to death, while Andrei Shuvalov and Vladimir Shestakov were sentenced to 15 and 4 years' imprisonment, respectively. Nikolai Shestakov was executed by firing squad in 1978.

By the time of his arrest, he was married and had a son.

=== In the media ===
- Documentary film "Brothers by blood." from the series "The investigation was conducted..."
- Documentary film "A dragon with three heads." from the series "Legends of Soviet Detection"

== See also ==
- List of Russian serial killers
- List of serial killers by number of victims
