= Monsters of Ecatepec =

Mexican serial killers

Juan Carlos Hernández
- Born: 1985; Lázaro Cárdenas, Michoacán, México
- Occupations: Clothing seller and serial killer
- Years active: 2012–2018
- Spouse: Patricia Martínez (m. 2008)
- Children: 4
- Status: Convicted
- Motive: Sexual compulsion, hatred
- Convictions: Femicide (9 counts) illegal adoption illegal inhumation of human remains
- Penalty: 300+ years in prison

Details
- Victims: 10–20
- Country: Mexico
- State: State of Mexico
- Location: Ecatepec de Morelos
- Date apprehended: 4 October 2018

Patricia Martínez
- Born: 1980; Lázaro Cárdenas, Michoacán, Mexico
- Occupations: Clothing seller, housewife and serial killer
- Years active: 2012–2018
- Spouse: Juan Carlos Hernández (m. 2008)
- Children: 4
- Status: Convicted
- Motive: Sexual compulsion (?), retention of partner
- Convictions: Femicide (9 counts) illegal adoption illegal inhumation of human remains
- Penalty: 300+ years in prison

Details
- Victims: 10–20
- Country: Mexico
- State: State of Mexico
- Location: Ecatepec de Morelos

The "Monsters of Ecatepec" is the name given to a serial killing couple Juan Carlos Hernández (1985, Lázaro Cárdenas, Michoacán) and Patricia Martínez (1980, Lázaro Cárdenas, Michoacán). The case also received the names of "The House of Horror" or "The Butchers of Ecatepec". Active in Ecatepec de Morelos, State of Mexico, from 2012 to 2018, the pair are suspected to have committed between 10 and 20 murders, and have also confessed to cannibalizing the bodies of their victims. The pair were apprehended on October 4, 2018, when transporting human remains in a baby stroller.

== Background ==
They were both born in Lázaro Cárdenas, Michoacán, within a five-year age gap. Juan Carlos' mother was a single mother, who allegedly often dressed him as a girl, brought men to her house and forced her son to watch her sexual encounters. Also, he declared that in his childhood, he suffered sexual abuse by another woman who at the time was his caretaker. When he was 10 years old, he fell from the stairs and suffered a severe traumatic brain injury. Patricia Martínez was born to a poor family, and was manipulative. She was diagnosed with a borderline intelligence disorder linked to intellectual disability. She was a prostitute at the time.

The couple met in 2008, when Patricia worked as a waitress at a restaurant, of which Juan Carlos was a regular client. They initiated a relationship and, although he bragged to be an "assassin", she decided to move with him. The couple had four children during their 10-year relationship. They opened a family business where they sold clothing, perfume and cell phones.

== Crimes ==
Their first victim, according to Patricia's declaration, was a 22-year-old woman who Juan Carlos lured with job promises. In their house, Hernández led her to their bathroom where he raped, beheaded and dismembered her. Martínez kept their children outside the house while the murder occurred. After the murder, Martínez partially cooked the body and ate it with her husband. Their second victim was a teen girl who lived next to them, who suffered an inhalants addiction; they allegedly lured her with promises of wealth. Like the first victim she was also raped, beheaded and dismembered in their bathroom. Patricia cooked the victim's body in oil and salt. In 2019, the couple was sentenced to 114 years after being convicted of murdering Arlet Samanta and Nancy Noemi, who were killed in April and September 2018 respectively. In addition, they were also convicted of selling Noemi's baby to another couple and hiding a body. In February 2021, the couple were given a life sentence for the murder of a 13-year-old girl in 2012. Prior to that, they were convicted of murdering five other women and a child which resulted in their sentence surpassing 300 years. In total, they were convicted of killing at least nine people.
