= Harald Sassak =

Austrian serial killer

- Born: 1948; Austria
- Died: 21 August 2013 (aged 64–65); Weitra, Austria
- Convictions: Murder (x5); Robbery (x9)
- Penalty: Life imprisonment

Details
- Victims: 5
- Span of crimes: 1970–1972
- Country: Austria

Harald Sassak (1948–21 August 2013) was an Austrian serial killer who went into criminal history as a gas assassin. He was also the longest-serving of Austrian imprisoned convicts. In the years 1971 and 1972, he committed, amongst other crimes, six killings out of greed and served a life sentence in prison for them.

== Life ==
Harald Sassak was the son of a bricklayer and an operator. He worked as a plumber and did his military service in the army from 1966 to 1969 in the Lainz hospital as an auxiliary. After he suffered from jaundice, he did not bring his employer medical confirmation and was therefore dismissed. He also gave up his subsequent job as a confectioner. He was described as very friendly and helpful by his family, friends and superiors. He always did very well in school and did not receive any disciplinary sanctions from the army.

When one day an elderly woman approached him, asking him if he could repair her gas appliance and then tipped him, he developed an idea he called the "gas trick."

Between 31 August 1970 and 12 February 1972, he spent time with elderly people as a servant of the gasworks, who wanted to check their equipment. As soon as he knew where the covert funds were, he diverted his victim, for example, by asking for a glass of water. If caught in the act, he killed his victim and fled. In some raids, his accomplice Johann Sharaditsch, whom he had met in a liquor room, helped him.

Surviving victims said that a chubby, nice man had asked for admission with the words: "The gas man is here!". He was always well dressed and had a seemingly valid identity card and expertise. Only after the victims revealed their money caches did he strike them down and rob them. Except for a single fingerprint, which could not be assigned to any person from the police files, no trace of the offender was left. However, when a neighbour of one of the victims, a graphic designer, had a very accurate facial composite of the perpetrator made by the draftsman of the bureau, the search became more concrete. A waiter of the Reiser hotel recognised the man as Harald Sassak by the facial composite and led the officials to the culprit, who was drinking a glass of wine. One of his victims identified him at the hotel and Sassak was arrested. On the way to the office, he confessed to his crimes.

On 22 January 1974, Sassak's trial began, with the reading of the indictment taking more than an hour. He confessed to his crimes, but claimed he did not participate in any murders. The coroner said that 79-year-old Richard Langer and 86-year-old Josefa Fierlinger died as a direct result of the violence. 69-year-old Aloisia Meschnark died of kidney failure 17 days after being hospitalised, 66-year-old Rosa Schwarz after seven days of brain soreness, 86-year-old Maria Aberle and 85-year-old Eleonore Hauer after ten or 38 days of pneumonia. According to the report, there was a connection between the death of women and the use of force. Gabriele Hammer, who died 54 days after being attacked by Sassak, could no longer find evidence of violence.

On 7 February 1974, Sassak was convicted of robbing Josefa Fierlinger, the predatory manslaughter of Richard Langer, Aloisia Meschnark, Rosa Schwarz, Maria Aberle and Eleonore Hauer, as well as robbery and theft in nine cases, for which he was sentenced to life imprisonment. His accomplice, Johann Sharaditsch, was guilty of theft, robbery in two cases and theft in two cases and was sentenced to 18 years in prison.

Sassak died on 21 August 2013, as a result of prolonged illness in a Lower Austrian nursing home, after being released from prison shortly after more than 39 years behind bars.

== See also ==
- List of serial killers by country

== Literature ==
- Andreas Zeppelzauer, Regina Zeppelzauer: Mord. Die spektakulärsten Mordfälle Österreichs; Psychogramme, Bilder und Berichte. Verlag für Sammler, Graz 2005, ISBN 3-85365-215-8.
