= Mikhail Novosyolov =

Soviet-Tajik serial killer

- Born: Mikhail Novosyolov; Sarapul, Udmurt ASSR, RSFSR
- Other name: "The Necrophile Rebel"
- Conviction: Murder
- Penalty: Civil commitment

Details
- Victims: 22
- Span of crimes: 1977–1995
- Country: Soviet Union, later Russia and Tajikistan
- Date apprehended: 1995

Mikhail Novosyolov (Russian: Михаи́л Новосёлов) is a Soviet-Tajik serial killer and necrophile. He killed 22 people of both sexes aged between 6 and 50 years old - 16 in Russia, and six in Tajikistan.

He was born in Sarapul. Novosyolov has been sentenced a total of three times. The first term was 17 years due to a quarrel in which he wounded two men with a knife. After he was released, he met up with a prostitute, but she roughly ridiculed his sexual incompetence, and he stopped trusting women.

The first murder was committed in the city of Chaykovsky, Perm Krai. The victim was a random girl. Fearing arrest, Novosyolov fled the scene, but after a few hours, he came back and committed sexual acts with the body.

He easily found a common language with future victims, appearing to be a professional in various fields. He killed with a blow to the head with any heavy object, then choked and committed sexual acts with the victim's body. The only exception was a double murder: by promising to give them chewing gum, he lured a girl and a boy. They were killed by a sharp electrode hidden under the saddle of a bicycle, and their bodies were thrown in an aryk.

Authorities did not suspect Novosyolov for a long time, since he committed crimes in different settlements, so they were not immediately connected as a series. In addition, he had 3 passports with different surnames, which allowed him to impersonate others.

After the announcement of an all-Russian search, Novosyolov left for Tajikistan, where he began working in a psychiatric hospital in Dushanbe. He was detained accidentally when he tried to steal an air rifle in the Central Park of Dushanbe. He was placed in the pre-trial detention centre and a criminal case was brought against him for theft. A few days later information came out that Novosyolov was being investigated for 3 murders associated with rape and 9 attempts to rape minors. During the interrogations, he confessed to three more murders committed in Tajikistan, as well as 16 in Russia (Volga, Ural and Siberia). He pointed out the burial sites of his victims.

He was found to be insane and sent to civil commitment.

== See also ==
- List of Russian serial killers
- List of serial killers by number of victims

== Literature ==
- Mamichev D.A. Criminals and crimes from antiquity to present day. Maniacs, murderers. — Donetsk: Stalker, 1997. — ISBN 966-7104-75-3 (Некрофил с тремя паспортами).
- Miroshnikova V. V, Bati Ya. A., Sklyarenko VM, Pankova MA. 100 famous litigations. — Kharkov: Folio, 2009. — ISBN 978-5-4444-1064-6 (Русский каннибал).
- Revyako TI, Trus NV. Killers and maniacs. - Minsk: Literature, 1997. — ISBN 985-6274-67-2 (Михаил Новосёлов. «Обожает убивать девочек и рисовать лебедей»).
