= Philipp Tyurin =

Soviet serial killer

- Born: Philipp Petrovich Tyurin; 1910; Sumerki, Ryazan Governorate, Russian Empire
- Died: 1947 (aged 36–37); Leningrad, RSFSR
- Cause of death: Execution by shooting
- Other names: "The Leningrad Maniac" "The Hellraiser" "Philipp the Bloody"
- Conviction: Murder
- Penalty: Death

Details
- Victims: 14–29
- Span of crimes: 1945–1946
- Country: Soviet Union
- State: Leningrad
- Date apprehended: 27 January 1947

Philipp Petrovich Tyurin (Russian: Фили́пп Петро́вич Тю́рин; 1910 – 1947), known as The Leningrad Maniac (Russian: Ленинградский маньяк) and The Hellraiser (Russian: Восставший из ада), was a Soviet serial killer who operated between 1945 and 1946 in Leningrad. According to investigators, during this period Tyurin murdered 14 people, but he himself confessed to a total of 29 murders.

== Biography ==
Tyurin, a veteran of the Great Patriotic War, who was seriously wounded after enrolling in the ranks of the armed forces, and was treated in one of the military hospitals of Leningrad. After the war, he decided to stay in the city. In April 1945, Tyurin got a job as a teamster at the canteen of the Bolshevik plant and was allocated a room in the hut. It was there that he lived until the moment of his arrest half a year later, and where, according to investigators, he committed all of his murders. At his disposal was also a telega drawn by a horse, which allowed him to freely remove the bodies in the dead of night.

The first murder he committed was in April 1945. All of the murders, as Tyurin himself said, were committed in the same scenario - in the Baptist and Smolensk markets of Leningrad, he tracked down people with large sums of money or valuable things to exchange, offering them to sell potatoes at a reduced price, after which he took them to the hut. In the hut, he offered the victim to go down into the cellar and collect the potatoes themselves. When the buyer began to descend the stairs, Tyurin would hit them on the head with a heavy object. Nevertheless, this version caused great doubts, since the examination showed that there were no traces of human blood in the barracks, it was likely that Tyurin committed the killings outside of the barracks, and undressed the victims afterwards.

According to Tyurin, in the period between April 1945 and December 1946, he committed 29 murders. He dropped a number of bodies into the Utkina Zavod, which is probably why they were never found. In December 1946, near the hut where the murderer lived, the bodies of two of his victims were discovered. The surrounding buildings were checked, and traces of blood were found in Tyurin's room, which later turned out to be traces of animal blood, but law enforcement agencies became interested in the teamster. At that time, Tyurin returned home to the Ryazan Oblast and, according to the testimony of neighbours, his luggage was around 11 suitcases. On 27 January 1947, when Tyurin returned to Leningrad, he was arrested and interrogated. During the initial interrogations, he refused to testify but soon began speaking. During the investigation, the bodies of 13 victims were found, one more was not possible to be located, since a railway was laid above the burial site. At least nine more victims of Tyurin, by his own admission, were drowned in the Utkina Zavod, however, the bottom of the reservoir was so silty that even divers could not find the bodies. As a result, Tyurin was accused of committing 14 murders. On 4 May 1947, his case was transferred to the court, which soon sentenced him to death by firing squad. The sentence was carried out in 1947.

=== In the media ===
- The documentary film "Philipp the Bloody" from the series "The investigation led...".
- Documentary film "Hellraiser" from the series "Legends of Soviet Investigation"

== See also ==
- List of Russian serial killers
- List of serial killers by number of victims

== Literature ==
- А. И. Ракитин. Socialism does not breed crime. — Yekaterinburg: Cabinet Scientist, 2016. - 530p.
