= Oklahoma City Butcher =

Unidentified serial killer

- Other names: OKC Butcher
- Years active: 1976–1986

Details
- Victims: 3
- Country: United States
- State: Oklahoma
- Date apprehended: N/A

The Oklahoma City Butcher is an unidentified serial killer who murdered three women between 1976 and 1986 in Oklahoma City. The killer murdered, dismembered, and mutilated young homeless Native American women.

== Victims ==
=== Cathy Lyn Shakelford ===
The first known victim was Cathy Lyn Shakelford, a member of the Sac and Fox Nation. She ran away at the age of 17 and lived homeless in Oklahoma City. The last sighting of her alive was two months before her death, when she was being treated at the Oklahoma City Hospital.

Her remains were discovered in an abandoned house by three oil workers on April 1, 1976, who called the police after they found her head in a popcorn bucket. The victim's legs, arms, and torso were later found spread throughout the home. Her sexual organs and hand were removed and never found. The perpetrator also mutilated Shakelford's face by carving a smile into it.

She remained unidentified until 1993, when her cousin, Andra Medina, reported her missing to the police. She contacted Sergeant Norma Adams, who connected the missing Cathy Lyn Shakelford to the unidentified woman. They were later confirmed to be the same person after DNA testing.

=== Arley Bell Killian ===
On April 19, 1979, children playing basketball in a park discovered a human head. Over the next few days, police found more of her remains scattered throughout the neighborhood. Some of the body parts were wrapped in bags and newspapers. The body parts had an odd absence of blood because the killer washed them before disposing of them. Her left hand, pelvis, head, shoe, and other parts of her flesh were found.

She was identified as 22-year-old Arley Bell Killian a week later. Killian was homeless due to substance abuse. She was last seen just four hours before her head was discovered in the park.

Over the next two months, the police found more body parts. Some speculated that the killer was playing a game—disposing of the woman's body parts to toy with the police.

=== Tina Marcia Sanders ===
The final victim was 22-year-old Tina Marcia Sanders, a homeless Native American woman. Her torso and left leg were found in an alleyway by a man walking in his backyard on March 6, 1986. Her head, which was set on fire, was found just a block away in a garbage bin the following week. She was quickly identified because of her tattoos. She was last seen just a day prior to her death.

== Announcement of a serial killer ==
Weeks after the discovery of Tina Sanders, police linked her murder to the previous two murders. Police believe that all of the victims were killed by a single perpetrator. All were killed, dismembered, and mutilated in a similar manner; the first two had unique cuts on their lower lip, and all were beheaded and had their sexual organs removed, which were never found. Furthermore, all victims were young, homeless Native American women.

== Suspect ==
=== Henry Lee Lucas ===
Henry Lee Lucas was a drifter and American serial killer who confessed to hundreds of unsolved murders. One of these murders was the murder of Arley Bell Killian. However, it's possible that Lucas was not the perpetrator since he falsely confessed to murdering hundreds of women.

== See also ==
- List of fugitives from justice who disappeared
- List of serial killers in the United States
