= Vladimir Sulima =

Soviet serial killer

- Born: Vladimir Stepanovich Sulima; 1946; USSR
- Died: 25 November 1968 (aged 21–22); USSR
- Cause of death: Execution by shooting
- Other names: "The Bloody Casanova" "The Hammer Maniac"
- Conviction: Murder
- Penalty: Death

Details
- Victims: 3
- Span of crimes: March – June 1968
- Country: Soviet Union
- State: Perm
- Date apprehended: 1968

Vladimir Stepanovich Sulima (Russian: Влади́мир Степа́нович Сулима́; 1946 – 25 November 1968), known as The Bloody Casanova (Russian: Кровавый Казанова), was a Soviet serial killer and rapist.

== Biography ==
Sulima was born in 1946, and brought up into the family of a religious sectarian fanatic. His father forced him to read prayers, whipped him with rods and put his knees on buckwheat. Once, he even pushed his young son into a barrel and threw him into a ravine, as a result of which Sulima lost consciousness.

In 1960, at the age of 14, Sulima "shot" an adult man. After that, he repeatedly engaged in sexual relations with men and women. Later he began to attack and rape women. At the time of his arrest in 1962, when he was 16 years old, he had 13 rapes, most of which occurred in the Chernyayevsky Forest.

The court sentenced him to 8 years imprisonment with a sentence in a penal colony for minors. No one touched Sulima there, as inmates were shocked by his unnaturally large sexual organ. Sulima got a good job at the colony, and the educators, affected by the size of his penis, enjoyed sexual contact with him. He spent less than half his sentence, as the management of the colony decided that Sulima was on the path of correction. In 1966, he received parole, and got a job at the Polytechnic Institute. He married, and a child was born into the family.

== Murders and arrest ==
The first murder Sulima committed was in the spring of 1968. Near the "Lokomotiv" stadium, he attacked Galina Belonozhko, smashing her skull. Motivated by rape, he committed a further 9 more attacks, two of which ended in murder. Witnesses to one of the killings were children who were playing a war game, one of them noticing a distinct trait of the maniac - large, bulging ears.

Sulima's last victim survived the attack. The day after the attack, she went to the clinic, where she saw her assailant. She called the police, but he managed to escape from the facility. However, he left behind a medical card, was identified and subsequently arrested. He immediately confessed to everything but did not have any remorse for his actions.

I slept all night in Perm. When I woke up, it was already morning. I do not know how much time, but dawn had come. Here it is. I saw that along the staircase (a pedestrian crossing) through the railroad tracks to the left of the train station, there was a woman going up. I do not know why, why, as I went out, I took a hammer in the cabin, so I went after her. I came across people to meet. When she passed through the stairs, then, then turned right. I followed her. Past the fire department. There I began to catch up with her. And why I did it, how, I can not explain. I had no such goal, to kill or rape there. I took it, pulled the hammer out of my pocket, hit it on the head ... I ran along some streets, examined the woman’s bag as I went. Nothing was there, here. I threw the bag at some fence.

== In the media ==
- Documentary film from the series "The investigation led..." - "Bloody Casanova".

== Literature ==
- Nikolai Modestov (1997). Maniacs...Blind death: Chronicle of serial murders (PDF). Nadezhda-I. ISBN 5-86150-041-X. Archived from the original (PDF) on 10 September 2016.

== See also ==
- List of Russian serial killers
