= Zaven Almazyan =

Soviet serial killer and rapist

- Born: Zaven Sarkisovich Almazyan; 5 May 1950; Rostov-on-Don, RSFSR, Soviet Union
- Died: 1973 (aged 22–23); Ukrainian SSR, Soviet Union
- Cause of death: Execution by shooting
- Other names: "The Voroshilovgrad Maniac" "Hunter of the Dead" "Steel Fingers"
- Conviction: Murder
- Penalty: Death

Details
- Victims: 3
- Span of crimes: April – October 1970
- Country: Soviet Union
- State: Luhansk
- Date apprehended: 8 November 1970

Zaven Sarkisovich Almazyan (Note: Russian: Завен Саркисович Алмазян, Armenian: Զավեն Սարգիսի Ալմազյան) (5 May 1950 – 1973), known as the Voroshilovgrad Maniac (Russian: Ворошиловградский маньяк, romanized: Voroshilovgradskiy manyak), was a Soviet serial killer and rapist who committed a series of crimes in Rostov-on-Don and Voroshilovgrad between 1969 and 1970, including three murders.

== Biography ==
Almazyan was born on 5 May 1950, in Rostov-on-Don in an Armenian family. During his childhood, in parallel with studying at school, he was engaged in freestyle wrestling, having mastered the stifling techniques which he would later use on his victims. In 1968, he graduated from school and entered a technical school, working as a loader. It was at this time that there was a psychological breakdown of his character - a girl to whom he expected to lose his virginity, preferred another man instead of him.

=== Crimes ===
Since early 1969, Almazyan began to attack women who conducted the same scenario - he put a knife to the victim's face and said that she had lost in cards, then would take them to a secluded place and rape the victim. During the third attack, Almazyan lost a student card in his name but managed to convince officers who were investigating the rapes that it was not him. However, frightened that he might be captured, he went to the military commissariat and asked to serve in the Soviet Army. Almazyan served in one of the military units in Voroshilovgrad, looking after a pigsty. This post allowed him to avoid vigilant control by the command and get the opportunity to go on unauthorized absences. On 26 March 1970, he made his first attack in Voroshilovgrad, and in the next 2 weeks - 5 more attacks. Seeing the serial nature of his crimes, the leadership of the regional police department sent reinforced police patrols and druzhinas to the streets, amassing a number of about 300 people. Fearing capture, Almazyan began to commit crimes in the most deserted areas of the city.

On 14 April 1970, Almazyan committed his first murder. He bound the hands of 17-year-old Svetlana Mazurina and plugged her mouth with a piece of wafer towel, raping and strangling her afterwards. As a "trophy", he took away the victim's gold jewellery. On 16 May 1970, while trying to rape one of the girls who played the role of "bait" for the maniac, a certain Vitaly Vlasov was detained. He confessed to a number of rapes he committed between 1966 and 1970 (a total of 22 rapes were proven), but refused to plead guilty for the murders. Subsequently, Vlasov was sentenced to 15 years imprisonment. Soon, also, when attempting to rape a 13-year-old girl, another alleged maniac was detained, but he was not the same killer. An anonymous letter came to the police, the author of which claimed to know who the killer was, but this information went unconfirmed after a check.

On 4 July 1970, Almazyan committed the murder-rape of 17-year-old Nina Zaikova, leaving a fragment of the newspaper "Rural Life" at the crime scene. On 6 August 1970, he attacked 20-year-old Olga Serova while she was returning home from work, but the intervention of a passer-by forced him to flee. On 22 September 1970, Almazyan made another unsuccessful attack, again fleeing from casual passers-by. At the crime scene, he left a scrap of sheet on which there was a stamp from the military unit. However, the investigation failed to take advantage of this because of an error in the examination, which determined the half-eroded figures incorrectly. Later, on 21 October, Almazyan raped and murdered 20-year-old Larisa Rogova, stealing her earring and a red sweater. On the night of 7 to 8 November, he attacked a woman in the city parks, but a group of volunteers, who were nearby, rushed after him in pursuit. As a result of combing the park, Almazyan and five other suspicious men were detained, but one of the maniac's surviving victims managed to identify him.

=== Trial ===
Almazyan soon confessed to all his crimes in Rostov-on-Don and Voroshilovgrad. During the subsequent search, all the stolen things from the raped and murdered women were found in his shed. In total, he committed 3 murders and 12 rapes. The visiting section of the Military Tribunal of the Kiev Military District sentenced Zaven Almazyan to death. The Supreme Court of the Soviet Union left the verdict unchanged. In 1973, he was executed by firing squad.

== In the media ==
- Documentary film Steel Fingers from the series "The investigation was conducted..."

== See also ==
- List of serial killers by country

== Literature ==
- A. I. Rakitin: Socialism does not breed crime. - Yekaterinburg: The Cabinet Scientist, 2016 - 530 p.
