= José Paz Bezerra =

Brazilian serial killer (born 1945)

- Born: December 12, 1945 (age 80); Alagoa Nova, Brazil
- Other names: "The Monster of Morumbi" "The São Paulo Strangler"; Gilberto José Oliveira
- Conviction: Murder
- Penalty: 100 years imprisonment

Details
- Victims: 7–24
- Span of crimes: 1970 – 1971 (confirmed)
- Country: Brazil
- States: São Paulo, Pará
- Date apprehended: November 12, 1971

José Paz Bezerra (born December 12, 1945), known as The Monster of Morumbi (Portuguese: O Monstro do Morumbi), is a Brazilian serial killer who was convicted of killing at least seven women in São Paulo and Pará from 1970 to 1971, although he claimed responsibility for 24 murders. Sentenced to 100 years imprisonment, he was sent to the São José Prison in Belém, where he served 30 years (the maximum available sentence) before being released in 2001.

== Early life ==
José Paz Bezerra was born on December 12, 1945, in Alagoa Nova, Brazil to José Borges Filho and Maria Paz. His early life proved to be difficult; the young Bezerra had to care for his father, who suffered from leprosy. His mother resorted to prostitution due to the family's extreme poverty. After his father's death, the family moved to a favela in Rio de Janeiro, where his mother found a new companion, Severino . He tolerated her extramarital activity, but resented Bezerra, whom he frequently beat. His mother eventually broke off the relationship after Severino started to engage in sexual relations with men in front of the boy. She moved in with another man, Manuel, who was not violent but still resented the young boy.

At the age of 10, Bezerra ran away from home and began living on the streets, selling candies at the Central do Brasil station. Even at a young age, he compulsively masturbated, and it was even claimed that he drove nails into his arm because he liked the sight of blood. In his adolescence, he started committing minor crimes and was jailed in correctional institutions repeatedly. After he turned eighteen, Bezerra enlisted in the Brazilian Army, but deserted after being accused of petty theft. Nothing is known of his activities thereafter until the late 1960s, when he resurfaced in São Paulo.

== Murders ==
=== São Paulo ===
On July 16, 1970, 36-year-old teacher Iolanda Pacheco was picked from Augusta Street up by a taxi driver wearing a coat and scarf. Instead of dropping her off at the requested address, the driver announced that he would take her to Morumbi. However, Pacheco managed to open the car door and jump out of the vehicle, which then sped away. She filed a report with the police, who made a facial composite of the man; however, they did not tie this case with the subsequent crimes until October 1970.

Three days later, police were alerted about the presence of a woman's body in a vacant lot in the Real Parque neighborhood, one kilometer away from the Palácio dos Bandeirantes. The victim was found half naked, gagged with her own bra and with her arms and legs tied with pieces of nylon stockings that also partially wrapped around her body and neck, indicating strangulation. Her face was also covered with bruises, making her almost unrecognizable. While doing forensics work in the field, authorities found the body of another woman who was in a similar condition. The São Paulo State Criminal Identification Institute successfully identified the two women via fingerprints, revealing their identities to be 23-year-old Nilza Alves Cardoso and 27-year-old Vanda Pereira da Silva.

By September 1970, the bodies of other victims started appearing in the Greater São Paulo area. What caught the attention of the authorities was the similarity in all the crimes: all victims had been dumped in vacant lots, naked, gagged, their hands and feet tied with pieces of their own clothes and with signs of strangulation and sexual violence (later proven to be carried out post-mortem). The press initially dubbed the unknown criminal "The São Paulo Strangler" (Portuguese: O Estrangulador de São Paulo) and drew parallels with the earlier serial killer Benedito Moreira de Carvalho.

Three victims were found that same July:

- Cleonice Santos Guimarães, a laborer (23): found in a vacant lot near the Via Anchieta São Bernardo do Campo on July 19.
- Ana Rosa dos Santos, a domestic (47): found in a vacant lot near the Via Anchieta, São Bernardo do Campo on July 20.
- Wilma Négri, a telephone operator (35): found in a vacant lot in Jardim Bonfiglioli, Butantã on July 25.

Despite police efforts, no clue to the killer's identity emerged until October 7, 1970, when a burglary was reported at a mansion in Itaim Bibi, alleging that a scullery worker had stolen jewelry valued at 20,000 cruzeiros and later fled. His companion, a maid who worked at the mansion named Aparecida da Silva Oliveira, was later arrested and interrogated. In her statements, Da Silva claimed that her companion, José Paz Bezerra, was the "Monster of Morumbi". She claimed that one day, he came into the house looking visibly shaken and rummaging through drawers looking for money. When asked what was wrong, he broke down and confessed to killing seven women and threatened to kill both her and her two daughters. She also reported previous disturbing behavior, including killing the family dog with an axe and saying that he would cut off her tongue if she asked too many questions.

In an attempt to substantiate her claims, the authorities searched her house, where they found newspaper clippings about the São Paulo murders, as well as clothes, jewelry, and other items which were identified by family members as belonging to the victims. In addition, Da Silva said that in October 1969, she and Bezerra lived in Vila Mangalot, near the Anhanguera highway, around the time two women were found murdered. The first were 44-year-old teacher Cenira de Castro Amorim, who was found in a plot of land near Anhanguera on October 7, and the second was 40-year-old coffee vendor Alzira Montenegro, who was found in the same lot as Amorim eleven days later. Unlike previous victims, however, Montenegro was shot to death. By that point, Bezerra had fled to Guanabara, where his mother and sister lived. Authorities unsuccessfully searched for him in São Paulo, Guanabura, the city of Recife, Ceará and his home state of Paraíba.

=== Pará ===
After fleeing Rio de Janeiro, Bezerra hitchhiked with several truck drivers until he arrived in Belém in November 1970. He soon resumed his attacks. On December 23, the Belém State Police found the bodies of two women in a vacant lot on the grounds of a radio station belonging to the Brazilian Navy. The first one was identified as 44-year-old teacher Maria Teresa Marvão, but the second victim's identity was never established. After these two, Bezerra is known to have struck twice unsuccessfully, with one victim escaping while the other ended up living with him until his arrest. On September 21, 1971, police found the body of his final confirmed victim, merchant Anibalina Martins, whose body was found in a vacant lot on Benfica Road, near Benevides.

== Arrest, trial and imprisonment ==
After spending several months on the run, Bezerra was arrested by policemen in Belém on November 12, 1971. He initially claimed to be a man named Gilberto José Oliveira, but his true identity was established after his papers were examined at the Félix Pacheco Identification Institute of Rio de Janeiro, which positively confirmed that the detainee was the wanted fugitive.

Bezerra was jailed at the São José Prison in Belém to await trial, where he attempted to commit suicide. During interrogations, he admitted responsibility for 24 total murders in the period between 1966 and 1971, claiming that he lured the women with his charm and good looks and was in relationships with them. Despite these admissions, he was found guilty of only seven murders and sentenced to 100 years imprisonment. A psychiatric examination determined that he had a compulsive hatred towards women that may have originated from his mother, whom he alleged had sex with several men at a time while he watched.

== Release ==
After initially serving his sentence in Belém, Bezerra was transferred to São Paulo in 1979, where he continued to serve until November 19, 2001. Since Brazilian law did not allow for prisoners to serve beyond 30 years, he was released at age 56. A few days after his release, he gave an interview with Agora by telephone, in which he claimed that his time in prison has made him reflect on his life, and that he is now completely reformed. He is still alive today, and presumably lives under a new identity.

== See also ==
- List of serial killers in Brazil
- List of serial killers by number of victims

== Bibliography ==
- Ilana Casoy (January 1, 2014). Serial Killers - Made in Brasil (in Portuguese). Darkside. ISBN 978-8566636291.
