= Fortunato Botton Neto =

Convicted Brazilian serial killer

- Born: 10 September 1963; São Paulo, Brazil
- Died: February 1997 (aged 33); Taubaté Prison, São Paulo, Brazil
- Other names: "The Trianon Maniac" "Pilo"
- Conviction: Murder x3
- Penalty: 8 years imprisonment

Details
- Victims: 3–13
- Span of crimes: 1986–1989
- Country: Brazil
- State: São Paulo
- Date apprehended: 1989

Fortunato Botton Neto (10 September 1963 – February 1997), known as The Trianon Maniac, was a Brazilian serial killer who killed between three and thirteen gay men in the vicinity of Parque Trianon in São Paulo from 1986 to 1989. He was convicted of three murders and sentenced to 8 years imprisonment, dying in prison in 1997.

== Early life ==
Fortunato Botton Neto was born on 10 September 1963, in São Paulo. He was raised in a religious household with what was described as a loving family, but from an early age he showed signs of an intellectual impairment, learning to speak when he was five years old. According to his later confessions, Botton was raped by a truck driver when he was eight, causing him to develop a deep hatred towards those who were physically stronger than him. He enrolled in school the next year, but his problems with learning and his frequent running away from home caused him to drop out. Around this time, he realized that he was attracted to other men, and when he was a teenager, he started offering sexual services to older men who were attracted to his muscular physique. Fortunato, known to his clients by the nickname "Pilo", frequented the Paulista Avenue near the São Paulo Museum of Art.

By the late 1980s, Botton began to have financial difficulties, as he had fewer and fewer clients willing to have sex with him due to his age. He then started committing petty thefts and robberies to get money, which he often spent on food or crack cocaine, of which he used about two grams per day. With his dire situation, Botton resorted to killing and then robbing his clients of any possessions he could get his hands on.

== Murders, arrest and confessions ==
Between 1986 and 1989, a mysterious series of murders against homosexuals began plaguing São Paulo, but was largely ignored by police due to social stigma and the unwillingness of potential victims to out themselves as gay by reporting it to the authorities. The killer had a mostly consistent modus operandi: his victims were always wealthy older men between 30 and 50 years of age who were killed in their own apartments. Each of them had gotten drunk before the murders, allowing the assailant to bind their hands and feet to the bed, undress them, and then either strangle or stab them, before stealing any valuables and leaving the crime scene.

The first recorded victim was 66-year-old decorator José "Zezinho" Liberato, whose naked body was found in his apartment on 7 December 1986. His legs had been tied together with a white sheet, his hands had been tied to his chest with an electrical wire, and a long scarf had been wrapped around his mouth. He had apparently been asphyxiated, as there was a piece of nylon tied around his neck.

The next known victim was Antônio Carlos Di Giacomo, a psychiatrist employed at the Instituto de Assistência Médica ao Servidor Público Estadual, who was found dead in his apartment in Vila Olímpia on 17 August 1987. Di Giacomo's killer had shoved his own socks down the man's throat, reaching his esophagus, before strangling him with a pair of jeans and then stabbing him repeatedly in the heart with a knife. This was shortly followed by the murder of Manoel "Maneco" Iraldo Paiva, a theater director living in Consolação, who was found strangled to death in his apartment. Like the previous victims, his killer had stolen numerous items from his apartment, including a Panasonic TV, a walkman, a watch, a portable typewriter, a Gucci messenger bag, a Mondaine watch, a checkbook from Banco Bradesco, and several pieces of clothing.

Following these murders, at least four more followed, on which little to no information was released to the public. The killings went under the police's radar until 1989, when Botton was arrested for extorting a 19-year-old student for money he had nicked from his car. When brought to the police station, Botton admitted that he had killed seven gay men from 1986 onwards, explaining in detail how he would repeatedly stab them post-mortem. According to him, most of the killings were a result of the victim underpaying him, but on a few occasions the reason was a negative remark; in the Di Giacomo case, he claimed to have killed the psychiatrist because he complained that he smoked too much.

Not long after his arrest, Botton was charged with three of the seven admitted murders, despite the fact that police believed he might've been responsible for 13 murders overall. Before his trial, he was examined by psychiatrist Guido Palomba, who concluded in a later report that Botton was a sexual sadist with epileptic episodes that caused him to have a violent temper, and that if released, he would likely kill again. He would be convicted on these charges, sentenced to 8 years imprisonment and sent off to Taubaté Prison. In the months after his conviction, he would be interviewed by Veja Magazine, where Botton would talk about his travels to foreign countries, his personal interests and even brag about his high-class clients, whom apparently ranged from important political figures to rock stars.

In February 1997, Fortunato Botton Neto was found dead in his cell at Taubaté Prison. An autopsy of the body confirmed that he had died from bronchopneumonia, caused by contracting AIDS.

== See also ==
- List of serial killers in Brazil

== Bibliography ==
- Roldão Arruda (1 January 2001). Dias de ira: Uma história verídica de assassinatos autorizados (in Portuguese). Editora Globo. ISBN 8525033715.
- José Marcelo Domingos de Oliveira (7 September 2009). Desire, Prejudice and Death (in Portuguese). Clube de Autores.
- Luiza Lusvarghi (28 March 2019). Crime as a Genre in Latin American Audiovisual Fiction (in Portuguese). Appris Editora e Livraria Eireli. ISBN 978-8547324179.
