= The Park Maniac =

The Park Maniac may refer to:

- Francisco de Assis Pereira, a Brazilian serial killer known as "O Maníaco do Parque"
  - The Park Maniac (film), a 2024 Amazon MGM Studios film about Pereira
- Alexander Pichushkin, a Russian serial killer known as the "Bitsa Park Maniac"
- Pavel Shuvalov, a Soviet-Russian serial killer known as the "Nevsky Forest Park Maniac"
- "The Rainbow Maniac", the nickname given to the unidentified suspect responsible for the Paturis Park murders in Brazil
- Samuel Sidyno, a South African serial killer known as the "Capital Park serial killer"
- Todd Alan Reed, an American serial killer known as the "Forest Park Killer"
- Cary Stayner, an American serial killer known as the "Yosemite Park Killer"
