= Laerte Patrocínio Orpinelli =

Brazilian serial killer and rapist

- Born: October 10, 1952; Araras, Brazil
- Died: January 3, 2013 (age 60); Iaras Penitentiary, Iaras, Brazil
- Other names: "The Bicycle Maniac" "The Monster of Rio Claro"
- Conviction: Murder x10
- Penalty: 100 years imprisonment

Details
- Victims: 10+
- Span of crimes: 1990–1999
- Country: Brazil
- State: São Paulo
- Date apprehended: January 13, 2000

Laerte Patrocínio Orpinelli (1952 – January 3, 2013), known as The Bicycle Maniac (Portuguese: Maníaco da Bicicleta), was a Brazilian serial killer and rapist who beat, raped and strangled at least 10 children around São Paulo from 1990 to 1999, but is suspected in more than 100 deaths since the 1970s. He was sentenced to 100 years imprisonment for his known crimes, and died behind bars in 2013.

== Early life ==
Laerte Patrocínio Orpinelli was born in 1952 in Araras, the seventh of nine children. From an early age, he was aggressive towards his siblings, neighbors and especially his mother, and would frequently try to attract attention by banging cans in the family yard. This angered his mother, Eliza, who tied him with pieces of rags to the edge of his bed or the foot of a table to keep him at bay. When he was untied, Orpinelli would retaliate by throwing bricks at her.

At school, he was considered an outcast, as he barely spoke, never played with other children and had poor grades, eventually dropping out in the third grade. In his early teens, he started drinking large quantities of alcohol which eventually spiralled into a drinking problem, for which he had to be interned in psychiatric clinics on several occasions. When he was not imprisoned, Orpinelli wandered around various towns in the northern parts of São Paulo, making a living as a door shiner for commercial establishments. He was noted for dirty, ragged appearance, but was otherwise considered harmless.

== Murders ==
By the early 1990s, the town of Rio Claro was still recovering by the crime spree of Francisco de Marco, who was accused of killing four children in the area. When children started to vanish again, with their skeletal remains later discovered in the Edmundo Navarro de Andrade State Forest, local population immediately attributed them to De Marco, despite him being imprisoned. However, when more remains continued to be discovered after that, it put the local population on high alert, with parents taking extra precaution to protect their children.

Orpinelli's modus operandi consisted of biking around various towns on his red bicycle, scouring for unsupervised children who were playing away from their parents. In some cases, he first befriended the possible victim's parents, granting him easier access to their child. When the parents weren't around, Orpinelli lured the children with promises of sweets or convincing them that he knew their parents. He then offered them to go to his house. If they accepted, he would give them a ride on his bike and go to isolated areas, usually forests or abandoned houses, where he would then rape them. His attacks incorporated extreme brutality and torture, and often resulted in him either beating them to death or strangling them. Sometimes, he would stone them to death, then left nude bodies out in the open.

In his later confessions, Orpinelli claimed that he had drunk the blood of some victims and that Satan influenced him to chase and kill children. At the same time, he claimed that his alcoholism greatly contributed to his crimes, saying that he would go out of his mind when he "had a few." His known victims were predominantly children aged 3–11 of an economically disadvantaged background, with no apparent preference when it came to sex. The crime scenes themselves were also very close to one another, with his known victims being in Rio Claro, Monte Alto, Pirassununga and Franca, although there's a possibility there might be more victims in other areas.

== Partial victim list ==
Orpinelli's first confirmed victims were cousins Osmarina "Marina" Pereira Barbosa and José Fernando de Oliveira, 10 and 9, respectively, who were approached by Orpinelli at their home in Rio Claro's Santa Maria neighborhood on January 17, 1990. Both were lured to a nearby canefield, where Orpinelli first raped and beat Pereira to death, before beating De Oliveira to death as well. He later claimed that the boy took longer to die than the girl. Both of the children's bones were found in September of that year.

On August 28, 1996, 8-year-old Aline Cristina dos Santos Siqueira disappeared from Rio Claro, and was reportedly last seen in the company of an individual riding a bicycle. Orpinelli later confessed to kidnapping and killing her, but her body has never been found.

On May 26, 1998, 11-year-old Edson Silva de Carvalho disappeared from Monte Alto, and his body was later found in an advanced state of decomposition. His first murder is the first known to be committed outside Rio Claro. According to Orpinelli, Silva started screaming while he was assaulting him, causing him to get angry and bash his head against the wall, killing him instantly.

Orpinelli's youngest known victim to date was 3-year-old Crislaine dos Santos Barbosa - her case is also distinguished by the fact that unlike the previous victims, her abductor actually stalked her mother, broke into the family home in Pirassununga and then kidnapped her on April 25, 1999. In his confession, Orpinelli claimed that he did not rape her, but instead just punched her to death. Dos Santos' skeleton was found a few months later in a sugar cane field behind a motel.

Orpinelli's final known victim was 9-year-old Jéssica Alves Martins, who was kidnapped from her home in Franca on November 21, 1999. Her body, showing signs of rape and strangulation, was found two days later in a cane field.

== Investigation ==
The crimes were initially considered unrelated and investigated separately, until December 1998, when police in Rio Claro received a complaint that an unknown individual had attempted to abduct two minors. While the police department did not give it much thought, the police chief of another department, Sueli Isler, became interested and started investigating further. However, she was only allowed to completely dedicate herself to the case the following year, and using information provided by the various' victims family members, the suspect's name and sketch were released to the public. This was distributed to the police stations of all nearby regions, and was quickly picked up by local newspapers and media.

== Arrest, trial and imprisonment ==
On the evening of January 10, 2000, Orpinelli was spotted at the Itu Night Hotel in Itu, a resting place for the homeless and indingents. He registered and stayed for three nights, and then went to the city of Leme, where he was arrested at a gas station by the Military Police. Orpinelli, who confessed to all of his crimes and presented a notebook in which he had written down his travel dates and locations, was first indicted in 2001, and in 2008, he was convicted and given a combined sentence of 100 years from the various municipalities.

== Death ==
On January 6, 2013, the São Paulo Penitentiary Administration announced that Orpinelli was found dead in his cell by jailers after being transferred to the Iaras Penitentiary in Iaras. His official cause of death was listed as natural causes, possibly caused by his diabetes and high blood pressure. His body was then buried in the Municipal Cemetery of Araras.

== In the media and culture ==
Multiple books and documentaries have covered the case, among them being an episode on Investigação Criminal, aired in 2013. A film based on the 2011 book O Matador de Crianças, written by Reginaldo Carlota, is currently in the works. One of his brothers was interviewed after his crimes, and in the interview, he proclaimed that he hasn't seen his brother in more than a decade and had no desire to see him.

== See also ==
- List of serial killers in Brazil
