= List of serial killers in Brazil =

A serial killer is typically a person who murders three or more people, with the murders taking place over more than a month and including a significant period of time between them. The US Federal Bureau of Investigation (FBI) defines serial killing as "a series of two or more murders, committed as separate events, usually, but not always, by one offender acting alone".

== Identified serial killers ==
Name	Years active	Proven victims	Possible victims	Status	Notes	Ref
do Amaral, José Augusto	1926–1927	3	8	Died before trial	Considered the first Brazilian serial killer; murdered and raped three young men around São Paulo; guilt is disputed	.
de Assis Pereira, Francisco	1997–1998	11	11	268 years imprisonment	Known as "The Park Maniac"; tortured, raped, and murdered women at a park in São Paulo	
Baptista, Douglas	1992–2003	8	8+	60 years imprisonment	Known as "The São Vicente Maniac"; bound and drowned children in Baixada Santista	
Basílio Rodrigues, Leandro	2007–2008	5	9+	111 years imprisonment	Known as "The Guarulhos Maniac"; strangled and raped women around Guarulhos	
Baú, Luiz	1975–1980	5	5	Escaped from custody; fate unknown	Known as "The Monster of Erechim"; schizophrenic who murdered a boy he groomed; later escaped and murdered an additional four people in four days	
Botton Neto, Fortunato	1986–1989	3	13	Died in prison	Known as "The Trianon Maniac"; murdered and robbed wealthy gay men around Trianon Park	
Bueno, Abraão José	2005	4	4	110 years imprisonment	Nurse who fatally sedated children in an attempt to save them and be portrayed as heroic	
Celestrino, Dyonathan	2008	3	3	Incarcerated	Known as "The Cross Maniac"; Neo-paganist who murdered three people in religious rituals	
Costa de Andrade, Marcelo	1991	14	14+	Interned at a psychiatric facility	Known as "The Vampire of Niterói"; murdered and raped young boys around Itaboraí, sometimes mutilating their bodies or drinking their blood	
Costa de Oliveira, Pedro	1922–1952	3	3	Died in prison	Murdered and raped women after their refused to cater to his sexual fetishes	
Ferraira de Sousa, Anísio	1989–1992	3	19	Died in prison	Doctor and spiritualist implicated in the Altamira child emasculations	
Figueira da Rocha, Diogo	1894–1897	50	50+	Presumably killed in a shootout with police	Career criminal who murdered various people around São Paulo	
Firmino Gomes, Roneys Fon	2005–2015	6	6+	21 years imprisonment	Known as "The Tower Maniac"; murdered prostitutes around Maringá and abandoned their bodies underneath electrical towers	
Garanhuns cannibals	2008–2012	3	8	Imprisoned	Trio of cannibals who murdered at least one teenage and two women in Pernambuco	
Gomes da Rocha, Tiago Henrique	2011–2014	11	39	25 years imprisonment	Former security guard who killed homeless people, women, and homosexuals during supposed robberies around Goiás	
Guimarães, Edson Izidoro	1999	4	131	76 years imprisonment	Nurse who fatally poisoned patients at a hospital in Méier to relieve them of their suffering	
Guimarães da Silva, Paulo Sérgio	1998–1999	7	7	184 years imprisonment	Known as "The Cassino Maniac"; targeted couples at Praia do Cassino	
Índio do Brasil, Febrônio	1925–1927	6	6+	Died in a psychiatric facility	Mentally-ill religious maniac who sexually assaulted and strangled young boys and teens	
Lisboa, Paulo José	1980s–2000	11	11	Died a free man in 2022	Known as "The Chain Maniac"; killed prostitutes in São Paulo and Espírito Santo, some while a fugitive from the law	
de Marco, Francisco	1953–1984	7	7+	Deceased; exact fate unknown	Known as "The Monster of Rio Claro"; raped and murdered children around São Paulo and Minas Gerais, emasculating his male victims	
Matias, José Vicente	1999–2005	6	6	23 years imprisonment	Former artisan who raped, murdered, and dismembered women across four states	
Moreira de Carvalho, Benedito	1952	11	11	Died in a psychiatric facility	Known as "The Monster of Guaianases"; rapist who strangled young children, often targeting those of Japanese descent	
Oliveira Rosário, Ademir	1991–2007	3	3	57 years imprisonment	Known as "The Cantareira Maniac"; serial rapist who murdered two teenagers after being released from a previous manslaughter conviction	
de Oliveira, Florisvaldo	1982–1983	50	50+	Murdered in 2012	Former police officer who murdered suspected criminals on the outskirts of São Paulo	
de Oliveira, Ibraim de Oliveira, Henrique	1991–1995 (Ibraim); 1995 (Henrique)	7 (Ibraim); 6 (Henrique)	8+ (Ibraim); 6+ (Henrique)	Killed by police (Ibraim); 40 years imprisonment (Henrique)	Known as "The Necrophile Brothers"; killed people around their hometown of Nova Friburgo, having sex with the bodies of female victims	
de Oliveira, Sebastião Antônio	1953–1975	5	5	Committed suicide before trial	Known as "The Monster of Bragança"; raped and murdered minors around Bragança Paulista	
de Oliveira Batos, Ronis	2011	8	8	Died in a psychiatric facility	Known as "The Itaquaquecetuba Serial Killer"; shot and stabbed men at random around Itaquaquecetuba	
Patrocínio Orpinelli, Laerte	1990–1999	10	10+	Died in prison	Known as "The Bicycle Maniac"; itinerant door shiner who raped and murdered children around São Paulo	
Paz Bezerra, José	1970–1971	7	24	Released in 2001	Known as "The Monster of Morumbi"; strangled and raped women around São Paulo and Pará	
Pereira da Costa, João Acácio	1966–1967	4	4	Killed in self-defense in 1985	Known as "The Red Light Bandit"; burglar who shot and killed four people during burglaries and robberies	
Ramos, José	1863–1864	9	9+	Died in prison	Together with his wife and an accomplice, committed the "Rua do Arvoredo murders" in Porto Alegre; killed and robbed wealthy immigrants, allegedly turning their remains into sausages	
Rodrigues de Brito, Francisco das Chagas	1991–2004	30	42	580 years imprisonment	Pedophile who raped, murdered, emasculated and mutilated young boys around Maranhão	
Rodrigues Filho, Pedro	1968–2007	71	100+	Murdered after release in 2023	Known as "Killer Petey"; vigilante who murdered other criminals while incarcerated in various prisons around Brazil	
Rosa da Conceição, Pedro	1906–1911	6	18	Died in a psychiatric facility	Murdered three people at a train station, and later two inmates and a guard at the psychiatric facility he was interned at; confessed to murdering a family of 12 in a previous incident	
da Silva, Adriano Vicente	2001–2004	10	13	264 years imprisonment	Known as "The Monster of Passo Fundo"; murdered a taxi driver in União da Vitória; escaped from prison, after which he started strangling children around Rio Grande do Sul	

== Unidentified serial killers ==
Name	Years active	Proven victims	Possible victims	Regions where active	Notes	Ref
Guarulhos Strangler	2001–2002	8	8	São Paulo	Raped and strangled women and young girls in Guarulhos	
Rainbow Maniac	2007–2008	13	13	São Paulo	Responsible for the Paturis Park murders targeting homosexual men; police officer Jairo Francisco Franco was charged, but later acquitted, of the crimes	

== See also ==
- Lists of serial killers

== Bibliography ==
- Burkhalter Chmelir, Sandra (2003). "Serial Killers". In Robert Kastenbaum (ed.). Macmillan Encyclopedia of Death and Dying. Vol. 2. New York: Macmillan Reference USA/Thomson/Gale. p. 1. Archived from the original on 3 May 2009.
- Morton, RJ (2005). "Serial murder multi-disciplinary perspectives for investigators" (PDF). Federal Bureau of Investigation.
- Hollandsworth, Skip (2015). The Midnight Assassin (1st ed.). New York: Henry Holt. p. 81. ISBN 978-0-8050-9767-2.
- Lane, Brian; Gregg, Wilfred (1995) [1992]. The Encyclopedia Of Serial Killers. New York City: Berkley Book. ISBN 0-425-15213-8.
