= Paulo Sérgio Guimarães da Silva =

Brazilian serial killer

- Born: 1971 (age 54–55); Rio Grande do Sul, Brazil
- Other names: "The Cassino Maniac" "Titica"
- Years active: 1971–1998
- Convictions: Murder ×7; Attempted murder ×3; Rape ×1; Attempted rape ×2; Robbery ×3
- Penalty: 184 years and 10 months imprisonment

Details
- Victims: 7
- Span of crimes: 1998–1999
- Country: Brazil
- State: Rio Grande do Sul
- Date apprehended: May 1999

Paulo Sérgio Guimarães da Silva (born 1971), known as The Cassino Maniac, is a Brazilian serial killer who murdered seven people at Praia do Cassino between 1998 and 1999. Due to the severity of his crimes, he was sentenced to 180 years imprisonment, and is one of the prisoners with the highest sentences in the state of Rio Grande do Sul.

== Biography ==
Paulo Sérgio, a fisherman, was initially imprisoned on an attempted murder charge. In late November 1998, after spending nine years in prison, he was released from the Rio Grande State Penitentiary.

== Crimes ==
Although Guimarães already had a criminal record, it was the murders between December 1998 and March 1999 that led him to infamy. During the summer season, he attacked couples who were making out in their cars on the edge of Praia do Cassino.

The first homicides occurred in December, when Paulo killed Felipe Santos, 19, and Bárbara da Silva, 22. The bodies of both, shot dead, were found on December 12 next to the car, parked near the sea. In early March 1999, he killed Anamaria Soares, 31, and Márcio Olinto, 30, who were found on the 10th at Praia do Totó, in Pelotas.

That same month, he attacked Petrick de Almeida, 18, and Brenda Graebin, 14, at Praia do Cassino. Petrick died on the spot, while Brenda, who would become the sole survivor of his killing spree, was crippled. Brenda claimed that she was raped, and only survived while pretending to be dead. A few days later, in the early hours of March 26, Paulo Sérgio killed Silvio Ibias, 36, and Adriana Simões, 28.

After committing the murders, Guimarães reported to the police and local residents who were arriving at the scene, waiting to hear what they would say.

== Arrest and conviction ==
During the course of the investigations, thirteen people were arrested. In May 1999, Paulo Sérgio confessed to the murders of seven people, as well as several other attempted murders and assaults in Rio Grande and Pelotas. Guimarães claimed that he had been "inspired by" Francisco de Assis Pereira, the Park Maniac, and that he was aiming to surpass his victim count. According to Diário do Grande ABC, he was the "greatest serial killer the state's history" at the time of his arrest.

In February 2002, Guimarães was sentenced to 171 years, 4 months and 20 days imprisonment for the commission of 14 crimes (7 homicides, one attempted murder, 3 robberies, 2 attempted robberies and one rape). The trial lasted two days and the jurors were unanimous in convicting him. The sentence was later extended to 184 years and 10 months in prison.

In 2007, Paulo requested that he be transferred from the Charquedas High Security Penitentiary, where he had been imprisoned since his initial conviction, to the Rio Grande State Penitentiary. The court, however, dismissed the request, judging that the transfer to the city where the crimes had been committed could lead to "social upheaval".

According to a survey conducted by Pioneiro in 2018, Guimarães was the eighth prisoner with the largest sentence in the state of Rio Grande do Sul.

== See also ==
- Francisco de Assis Pereira
- List of serial killers in Brazil
