= José Vicente =

José Vicente may refer to:

== Politicians ==
- José Vicente Reynafé (1782–1837), Argentine politician
- José Vicente Cuadra (1812–1894), Nicaraguan former president
- José Vicente Concha (1867–1929), Colombian former president
- José Vicente de Freitas (1869–1952), Portuguese politician
- José Vicente Faria Lima (1909–1969), Brazilian politician
- José Vicente Rangel (born 1929-2020), Venezuelan politician
- José Vicente Beviá Pastor (1933–2012), Spanish politician
- José Vicente Rangel Ávalos (born 1956), Venezuelan politician

== Sportspeople ==
- José Vicente Salinas (1904–1975), Chilean sprinter
- José Vicente (pole vaulter) (1922–2022), Puerto Rican pole vaulter
- José Vicente Grecco (1929–2008), Argentine footballer
- José Vicente (footballer) (born 1931), Spanish footballer
- José Vicente de Moura (born 1937), Portuguese Olympic Committee president
- José Vicente León (born 1943), Spanish swimmer
- José Vicente Sánchez (born 1956), Spanish footballer
- José Vicente Lledó (born 1971), Spanish footballer
- José Vicente García (born 1972), Spanish cyclist
- José Vicente Toribio (born 1985), Spanish cyclist

== Others ==
- José Vicente Feliz (1741–1822), Spanish explorer
- José Vicente Barbosa du Bocage (1823–1907), Portuguese zoologist
- José Vicente Matias (born 1966), Brazilian serial killer
