= Dyonathan Celestrino =

Brazilian serial killer

- Born: January 5, 1992 (age 34); Rio Brilhante, Mato Grosso do Sul, Brazil
- Other names: "The Cross Maniac" "DOG HELL 666"
- Status: incarcerated
- Conviction: Murder x3
- Penalty: 3 years

Details
- Victims: 3
- Span of crimes: July 2 – October 3, 2008
- Country: Brazil
- State: Mato Grosso do Sul
- Date apprehended: October 9, 2008
- Imprisoned at: Campo Grande Penal Institution, Campo Grande, Mato Grosso do Sul

Dyonathan Celestrino (born January 5, 1992), known as The Cross Maniac (Portuguese: Maníaco da Cruz) and by his Orkut handle, DOG HELL 666, is a Brazilian serial killer who committed three ritualistic murders in Rio Brilhante from July to October 2008, when he was still a teenager. Due to the high probability of him posing a future danger to society, he remains incarcerated.

== Murders ==
In 2008, Celestrino decided to murder those whom he perceived as "not following God's precepts." Along with his religious motivations, he was both inspired and challenged by Francisco de Assis Pereira, another Brazilian serial killer. Celestrino intended to surpass Pereira's ‘record’. He would pick his victims at random and bring them to an isolated area at knifepoint. First, he would ask them if they believed in God. If they answered ‘yes’, he would proceed to ask them various sexually related questions, such as what age they lost their virginity, how many partners they had, and their sexual preference. If he considered them impure, he would proceed to kill them, typically by asphyxiation. After murdering his respective victim, Celestrino would partially undress them, spread their arms and cross the legs at ankle height to resemble a cross.

=== Victims ===
Catalino Gardena, 33, killed on July 2 - a bricklayer and neighbor of Celestrino. Celestrino claimed that Gardena "deserved to die" because he was an alcoholic and a homosexual. He was found in a vacant lot. He was asphyxiated with a plastic bag and stabbed in the chest. The word INRI was written on a piece of paper nearby, standing for Jesus, King of the Jews.

Letícia Neves de Oliveira, 22, killed on August 24 - a lesbian gas station attendant. Found half-naked on a grave in a cemetery. Celestrino manually asphyxiated her.

Gleice Kelly da Silva, 13, killed on October 3 - a drug user. Found half-naked at an abandoned construction site. Celestrino had left a handwritten note next to the body which read “Corpse of Thor” in English, and “until next Hell” in Portuguese, although he later clarified he meant winter instead of Hell. All of his murders were committed during the Brazilian winter. If he wasn't arrested, he had intent to stop the murders after killing Da Silva and start again after next year's Yule.

== Investigation ==
After the murder of Da Silva, a special unit was formed to investigate her and the two previous murders, which were linked via a similar modus operandi. As part of the investigation procedures, officers interviewed Celestrino as he was Gardena's neighbor, but he was later identified as the murderer and arrested after he commented on an Orkut post commemorating Gleice. He commented “Dead people can’t receive Screeps, you sickos!" Screeps were the equivalent of replies on Orkut. After he posted this comment, police decided to search Gleice's phone and saw multiple calls from one same number. Both the Orkut account and the phone number were identified as Celestrino's, and he was arrested on October 9, 2008.

In Celestrino's room, police found the blouse of Gleice, necklaces and jewelry belonging to Gleice and Letícia, newspapers about his own case, and a picture of Francisco de Assis Pereira in the middle of an otherwise innocent poster board. Police also found a piece of paper with 3 names, 1 word beside each. “Catalino - Dead, Letícia - Dead, Carla - Saved”. Carla was one of the people who ‘passed’ his interview, and she was able to give police more details about Celestrino and his interview before his arrest.

In the aftermath of his arrest, investigator Maria de Lourdes Souza Cano issued a press statement commending her colleagues' work effort in capturing the criminal. She also claimed that Celestrino had apparently planned to commit a fourth murder, and he admitted to wanting to surpass Francisco de Assis Pereira in notoriety, stating he “liked Pereira because of how many women he killed”.

== Trial and imprisonment ==
Soon after his arrest, Celestrino was ordered to undergo a psychiatric evaluation. The results from the evaluation concluded that he had an antisocial personality disorder and chronic psychopathy, due to which he was prescribed medication. He was then transferred to the Unei de Ponta Porã, where he soon gained further notoriety for assaulting prison guards and having occasional outbursts.

Under Brazilian law, Celestrino was scheduled to be released in 2013 at the age of 21, but as he was deemed incapable of living a normal life, his sentence was extended indefinitely. While awaiting the final decision in his case, Celestrino managed to escape prison and flee to Horqueta, Paraguay with the help of his mother and his aunt on March 3, but was arrested only a month later on April 27 after a Brazilian salesman residing at the same hotel recognized him. 2 fake Facebook accounts were made of him after the news of his escape, one of the accounts threatening the town of Dourados.

Residents of the town nicknamed him ‘Johnny’, and 2 of his friends described him as a flirt. Celestrino even tried to make advances on a 15-year-old sister of one of these friends. Messages to her from him show that he tried to get her to go out drinking with him. Police also found a diary of his, the most notable excerpt which reads ‘In life and death, I am a serial killer’, and a miniature Portuguese-Spanish dictionary with strange drawings of his scrawled on the back pages. He also gave an exclusive interview in Paraguay after people found out who he was, and he made a deliberate lie, explaining he was a hitman hired to kill these people and execute the crimes in the way he did.

After his escape from Unei de Ponta Porã, he was transferred to the Campo Grande Penal Institution, and as of August 2022, Celestrino remains incarcerated. He is described as a good inmate, is currently studying for a degree in environmental resource management and receives regular visits from family members, and weekly calls with his mother. He has attempted to appeal various convictions from various charges committed in prison, most of which have been unsuccessful.

== See also ==
- List of serial killers in Brazil
