= Pedro Rosa da Conceição =

Brazilian mass murderer (died 1919)

- Died: February 25, 1919

Details
- Victims: 6–18
- Span of crimes: 1904–1911
- Country: Brazil
- Date apprehended: April 23, 1904
- Imprisoned at: Hospicio Nacional dos Alienados

Pedro Rosa da Conceição was a Brazilian spree killer who killed three people and wounded thirteen others in Rio das Pedras, Rio de Janeiro, Brazil, on April 22, 1904, before being arrested. He was then sent to a psychiatric hospital, where he later killed three more people: his cellmate Joaquim Alves Junior and an unnamed guard who attempted to calm him down during a fight in 1911, and an unnamed inmate in 1910. He was also said to have murdered a family of twelve in Rio das Pedras, though this is unverified.

== Rio das Pedras mass murder ==
Rosa was epileptic and worked at the Estrada de Ferro Central. On April 22, 1904, he armed himself with a bayonet and went to a locomotive in the Belém station alongside a partner. However, as the train was speeding, Rosa pushed the partner out of the train. When the train arrived at Rio das Pedras station, Rosa left.

He then walked to the Dona Clara station, where his progenitor named Ambrosio Gomes lived. Intent on killing him, Rosa started beating Gomes injuring him. He then hit his stepmother, Maria da Conceição. Rosa fled to Rio das Pedras and started wandering around, injuring people past him. When he went back to Dona Clara station, he stabbed a corporal named João Teixeira de Oliveira to death. On the road he wounded Seraphina Maria. Rosa then killed farmer Fructuoso Goulart do Amaral and fled. One of his victims, Felicidade Ignacia de Salles, 15, died on April 27.

Rosa was arrested while he hid in the bushes the following day. He was sent to the Hospicio dos Alienados, where he lived until his death on February 25, 1919.

=== Victims ===
Killed were:

- Jose Teixeira de Oliveira, 56, corporal
- Fructuoso Goulart do Amaral, 44, farmer
- Felicidade Ignacia de Salles, 15, died on April 27

Among those wounded were:

- Augusto Barreto do Pinho, 56, wounded in the abdomen
- Cahilde Luiza da Silva, 18
- Conceição Alves Moreira, 21
- Maria Florentina da Silva Nobrega
- Euphrasia Maria da Conceição
- Seraphina Maria

== First homicide in the Hospicio Nacional dos Alienados and later double homicide ==
The newspaper A Noite reports that Rosa killed an unnamed inmate in the hospital in 1910. A year later on October 1, 1911, Rosa and Joaquim Alves Junior had a fight in the Hospicio Nacional dos Alienados. Rosa killed Joaquim with an unspecified weapon and also killed an unnamed guard who tried to calm him down.

== Murder of twelve people of a family ==
A Noite, chronicling the crimes of Pedro Rosa, claimed that Rosa killed a family of twelve people, on an unspecified date and year.

== See also ==
- List of serial killers in Brazil
- List of serial killers by number of victims
