= Leandro Basílio Rodrigues =

Convicted Brazilian serial killer, rapist and necrophile

- Born: 1989 (age 36–37); Guarulhos, Brazil
- Other name: "The Guarulhos Maniac"
- Convictions: Murder x5 Rape x5
- Penalty: 111 years imprisonment

Details
- Victims: 5–9+
- Span of crimes: 2007 – 2008 (known)
- Country: Brazil
- State: São Paulo
- Date apprehended: 2008

Leandro Basílio Rodrigues (born 1989), known as The Guarulhos Maniac (Portuguese: Maníaco de Guarulhos), is a Brazilian serial killer who raped and strangled at least five women in Guarulhos between 2007 and 2008, raping their bodies post-mortem. For his known crimes, he was sentenced to 111 years imprisonment, but he could be possibly be responsible for at least 4 more murders.

== Biography ==
Leandro Basílio Rodrigues was born in 1989 in Guarulhos. He lived in an unstable home, as his mother often cheated on his alcoholic father, and he gradually began to harbor resentment against his mother's promiscuous behavior. At age of 13, he witnessed his mother getting shot twice by a boyfriend. While she survived, Rodrigues, disappointed by the outcome, vowed to become a killer himself.

Soon after the incident, he began committing crimes together with a 14-year-old girl, who bore him a child later on. However, the girl eventually grew tired of Rodrigues' criminal lifestyle and abandoned him. Embittered, Rodrigues soon began attacking and killing women.

=== Murders ===
Rodrigues' first known victim was 23-year-old Keliane Leite da Silva, a drug user who was beaten, strangled and then sexually abused in Jardim Adriana, Guarulhos on September 7, 2007. A month later, he repeated the act with Viviane da Silva Correa, whom he strangled and raped in an alley in the Vila Rio neighborhood.

The following year, his third known victim, student Juliana Teixeira do Nascimiento, was strangled and raped on the night between May 29 and 30, inside a trailer near the Rodovia Hélio Smidt, whose case was not connected to the others until years later. On August 26, he strangled and raped Aline Sena da Rocha, and days later, he attacked and killed his last known victim, Gisele Cabral de Souza, whom he choked to death in the parking lot of a sports stadium.

== Arrest, trial and imprisonment ==
Shortly after de Souza's murder, Rodrigues was arrested and charged with the four known murders attributed to the Guarulhos Maniac. During interrogations with police chief Jackson Cesar Batista, Rodrigues allegedly made a sudden confession to the August 2006 rape-murder of 22-year-old Vanessa Batista de Freitas, who was killed on Jardim Cristian Alice after returning home from a religious sermon. In his confession, he claimed to have stolen her cellphone and placed her white veil over her face before fleeing, later selling the phone to buy crack cocaine.

This revelation proved to be controversial, as three men had already been detained on suspicion of committing this murder: Batista's 24-year-old ex-partner, Renato Correia de Brito; as well as his two friends 28-year-old William César de Brito Silva and 25-year-old Wagner Conceição da Silva. The three men had proclaimed their innocence since their arrests, alleging that they had been tortured into confessing by police officers. As a result of Rodrigues' confession, they were temporarily released until the investigators could determine whether their claims of police brutality could be substantiated. The date for their jury trial was set for November 19, but during that time, Rodrigues recanted his confession, also claiming to have been tortured into confessing. As a result, the trio were convicted in a controversial 4-to-3 decision in favor of their guilt, and given sentences ranging from 24 to 9 years imprisonment, in addition to being required to give monetary reparations to the victim's children until they became adults.

It was later decided that Rodrigues would also face a jury trial for the four murders. He was first put on trial solely for the murder of Cabral, as an additional rape charge was added after the initial indictment. Around the same time, Teixeira's killing was forensically linked to the other cases. He was subsequently found guilty and sentenced to 25 years imprisonment.

Three years later, Rodrigues was brought to trial for the remaining murders, which he denied committing. Despite his refusals, he was found guilty and sentenced to a total of 111 years in prison without a chance of parole, and thereafter imprisoned at CDP Sorocaba.

== Possible additional victims ==
In the period between his initial detention and final sentencing, Rodrigues confessed to a total of 50 murders committed over several years and included both female and male victims, the latter of which were killed out of personal distrust or to get rid of criminal accomplices. This claim remains unsubstantiated, but it is known that at one point he had been investigated for 17 total murders, some of which were committed in São Paulo, Belo Horizonte and Rio de Janeiro. The Public Prosecutor's Office later narrowed down the count down a further four killings which they believe Rodrigues might've been responsible for.

== In the media ==
The case covered on the Brazilian television program Em Nome da Justiça, focusing primarily on the murder of Vanessa de Freitas and whether Rodrigues was the true culprit.

== See also ==
- List of serial killers in Brazil
