= Febrônio Índio do Brasil =

Brazilian serial killer

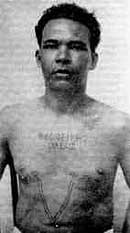
- Born: Febrônio Ferreira de Mattos (presumed); January 14, 1895; Jequitinhonha, Minas Gerais, First Brazilian Republic
- Died: August 27, 1984 (aged 89); Rio de Janeiro, Fifth Brazilian Republic
- Other names: Pedro de Souza; Dr. Bruno Ferreira Gabina; Joaquim Índio do Brasil; Dr. Febrônio Simões de Melo Índio do Brasil
- Conviction: Acquitted by reason of insanity
- Penalty: Compulsory treatment

Details
- Victims: 6+
- Span of crimes: 1925–1927
- Country: Brazil
- States: Espírito Santo, Rio de Janeiro
- Date apprehended: For the final time on August 31, 1927

Febrônio Índio do Brasil (January 14, 1895 – August 27, 1984) was a Brazilian rapist and serial killer.

== Biography ==
=== Childhood ===
Febrônio was born in the city of São Miguel de Jequitinhonha (present-day Jequitinhonha), probably on January 14, 1895. He was the second of fourteen children born to couple Theodoro Simões de Oliveira and Reginalda Ferreira de Mattos. His probable true name was Febrônio Ferreira de Mattos, but he gained fame as Febrônio Índio do Brasil, the "Son of Light", as he presented himself to police officers, journalists, judicial authorities and forensic psychiatrists.

His father, Theodoron, as he was best known, worked as a farmer, but for some time he had been a butcher. He was an alcoholic, and very often violently attacked his wife. On several occasions, Febrônio witnessed his mother's beatings. Theodoron was also violent towards his children.

Probably in 1907, at the age of 12, Febrônio fled his home in the company of a travelling salesman. He wandered the localities around his hometown until he arrived in Diamantina, where he learned to read and earned his living as a butler. Later, he moved to Belo Horizonte, surviving as a shoe shiner and a domestic servant.

Probably in 1909, Febrônio, aged 14, went to Rio de Janeiro, then the Federal Capital. He returned to the state capital of Minas Gerais in 1916 under the name of Pedro de Souza but soon returned to Rio de Janeiro.

=== Criminal life and mystical revelations ===
Since returning to Rio de Janeiro, Febrônio began to commit crimes. Between 1916 and 1929, dozens of passages were recorded by police for fraud, blackmail, bribery, theft, robbery and loitering.

During one of these arrests in 1920 at the Dois Rios Correctional Facility on Ilha Grande, Febrônio, who was reading a Bible in the intervals of praxitherapy during the night, had a vision in which a woman with long blond hair chose him as the Son of Light. With this title came the responsibility to declare to all that God had not died. According to the vision, he was to tattoo boys, albeit with the use of physical force, with the symbol of DCVXVI, which meant "God, Charity, Virtue, Holiness, Life, Magnet of Life." The tattoo would serve as a talisman for those who exhibited it on their body. Acting according to what had been commanded to him in the vision, Febrônio tattooed the phrase "Behold the Son of Light" on his chest and, throughout the circumference of his torso, the letters DCVXVI I. Febrônio then began to write a book titled The Revelations of the Prince of Fire, published in 1926, which details incomprehensible messages taken from the mysterious dreams that were transmitted to him.

In 1921, when he left the correctional colony, Febrônio set up a medical consumers' co-operative named The Auxiliadora Médica, announcing it in a classified ad of the newspaper Correio da Manhã. The ad was read by a dentist, Dr. Bruno Ferreira Gabina, who joined the co-operative. Febrônio, presenting himself as Joaquim Índio do Brasil, rented an office for the dentist and then went on to assist him with the appointments, but the two left the premises a month later, without paying the rent.

In 1922, after taking Dr. Gabina's diploma, Febrônio opened his own dental practice on Rua Visconde do Rio Branco, in Centro, where he demonstrated sadistic behavior by subsequently extracting several healthy teeth from those who sought his assistance. Due to his bad reputation, he turned his office into a job agency, which deceived people who, looking for work, deposited money for Febrônio. Pursued by the police, he moved to Bahia in 1925, where he pretended to be a dentist under the name of Febrônio Simões de Melo Índio do Brasil. From there he settled in Mimoso do Sul, in the state of Espírito Santo, where he pretended to be Dr. Gabina but soon left following the deaths of two children to whom he had prescribed drugs. Later, in the mining town of Rio Casca, presenting himself as Dr. Uzeda Filho, he continued to act as a fake doctor, eventually causing the death of a woman in childbirth.

Back in Rio de Janeiro, Febrônio was arrested on October 8, 1926, caught for acting suspiciously on a hill at the Sugarloaf Mountain. As he presented with delusional ideas and compulsive lying, he was admitted to the National Psychopath Hospital, which he left a few weeks later. During this hospitalization, he was examined by distinguished psychiatrist Dr. Adauto Botelho, who first diagnosed Febrônio with a mental disorder.

=== First sexual crimes ===
In January 1927, once again being arrested, Febrônio sexually subjugated two cellmates in the 4th Auxiliary Police Station in Rio de Janeiro. When he tried to rape a third, Djalma Rosa, Rosa resisted and was beaten to death.

On February 21, 1927, he was arrested again on the Corcovado hill while dancing, completely naked and with his body all painted yellow, in front of a terrified child who was tied to the trunk of a tree. As he heard from witnesses that Febrônio had earlier been spotted cooking a stolen human head from the Caju Cemetery in the house where he was a tenant, the deputy sent him back to the National Psychopath Hospital. At the time, he was examined by eminent physician Dr. Juliano Moreira, who, assisted by Dr. Henrique Roxo, confirmed that Febrônio had a mental illness.

In April 1927, Febrônio was admitted to the National Hospice of the Insane, at Praia Vermelha. When he was discharged, he took with him another inmate who was also discharged, 17-year-old Jacob Edelman, to whom he promised employment in his dental office. On the way, they sought 17-year-old Octávio de Bernardi, a young man who had been offered a job by Febrônio, this time in a slaughterhouse. At night, in a deserted place in Mangaratiba, he tattooed the inscription DCVXVI on Jacob's chest, before the terrified Octávio. A few days later in Praia das Flecheiras, a wasteland situated at the western end of Governador Island, an area that was later landed for construction of the Galeão Airport, Febrônio violated Jacob sexually; soon, he did the same with Octávio, not without tattooing him beforehand. A few days later the two boys were released, very terrified, but alive.

Febrônio again tattooed another victim, 18-year-old Manoel Alves, at the beginning of August 1927, deceiving him with a false promise of employment.

When detained at the House of Detention, Febrônio again committed sexual crimes against his cellmates. On August 8, 1927, he was released after being acquitted on July 27 of the murder of Ros. When he left, he was wearing a navy blue uniform and a cap stolen from a cellmate.

=== Murders ===
On August 13, 1927, Febrônio, wearing the same uniform and cap from the House of Detention, persuaded the family of Alamiro José Ribeiro that the 20-year-old Alamiro should accompany him to accept employment in his bus driving company. While they were in a forest on Ribeiro Island, near Jacarepaguá, Febrônio began arguing with Alamiro due to the young man's denial of his libidinous advances. Febrônio ended up strangling him with a green vine he found on the spot until he died of suffocation. Alamiro's body, dressed in a shirt and Febrônio's clothes, was found two days later.

On August 15, the same day that Alamiro's corpse was found, Febrônio, again resorting to a misleading promise of employment, tattooed a 16-year-old boy named Joaquim, who managed to evade his would-be killer.

Perhaps aware of the social commotion generated by Alamiro's murder, Febrônio traveled to Petrópolis, staying in room 3 of Hotel Rio Branco under the name of Dr. Gabina. In that city, Febrônio bought a suit from a tailor and left behind the navy uniform he wore during Alamiro's murder. When the tailor went to the hotel to receive the second part of his payment, Febrônio noticed a cyst on his neck and proposed to treat it, applying a tincture of iodine followed by a sudden blow with a knife, causing a painful hemorrhage that precipitated the tailor's escape without the other part of the money. A few days later, Febrônio returned to Rio de Janeiro.

On August 29, he approached 10-year-old João Ferreira, best known among his friends and relatives as "Jonjoca." Febrônio deceived the boy's parents by offering him a butler's job and, counting on their permission, left with him. When they found themselves in the woods of Largo do França, Febrônio promised Jonjoca a suit as a gift if the boy got the same tattoo as the one on his companion's chest. Frightened, he consented, and Febrônio performed the procedure with a needle, thread and red paint. Later, they went to the forest of Ribeiro Island, where Jonjoca was strangled with a rope. The boy's corpse was found on September 7, lying naked about 300 meters from where Alamiro's body had been discovered.

=== Indictment and judgment ===
On August 16, police were warned that a corpse had been found on Ribeiro Island the day before. The body was recognized as that of Alamiro José Ribeiro, next to which there was a cap. One of the investigators recalled that a few days earlier a detainee had been released from prison wearing that cap. In the House of Detention, the investigator obtained information that the cap had been stolen by Febrônio Índio do Brasil the day that he had been released. The mugshot from Febrônio's police file was shown to Alamiro's father, who identified him as the man who had offered his son a job at his bus company and left with him on the day of his disappearance.

Febrônio was finally located on August 31 while entering a train on the Leopoldina Railroad at Leopoldina Station. When led to the 4th Auxiliary Police Station in Rio de Janeiro, he was recognized by Jonjoca's father as the one who had proposed that Jonjoca work as a butler and taken him on the day of his disappearance. Two days later, on September 2, delegate Dr. Oliveira Ribeiro was able to obtain Febrônio's confession regarding Alamiro's murder. However, he only assumed responsibility for the murder of Jonjoca on September 8 when he declared that he had committed both crimes in a sacrifice to the living god, symbol of his religion.

On September 19, 1927, Febrônio was arraigned by the Public Prosecutor's Office for the murder of Ribeiro and Jonjoca. Two days later, he was transferred from the 4th Auxiliary Police Station in Rio de Janeiro to the House of Detention, where he received prison number 194. Several cases of children who were reported by the press as possible victims of Febrônio were excluded from the case for a lack of concrete evidence. It was not possible to prove that Febrônio had assassinated Dr. Bruno Ferreira Gabina in order to take possession of his diploma. Nevertheless, the whereabouts of the dentist had remained unknown, even by his own mother, Maria Ferreira Gabina, since 1922.

On September 21, the printed newspaper O Jornal began a series of reports entitled "The Criminal Febrônio before Psychiatry". The first interviewee was Dr. Faustino Espozel, professor of neurology at the Faculty of Medicine of the University of Rio de Janeiro, currently the Federal University of Rio de Janeiro. The next day it was Dr. Pedro Pernambuco Filho's, assistant professor at the same faculty, turn. The series ended on October 2 with an interview by Dr. Henrique Roxo, who had examined Febrônio earlier that year and recommended that the criminal be transferred to the National Hospice of the Insane. All three doctors were unanimous in stating that Febrônio had mental illness which motivated his crimes, and that he should be hospitalized in a psychiatric asylum colony for treatment due to the danger he presented.

In an interview with O Jornal on October 4, the jurist Dr. Evaristo de Moraes recommended that Febrônio be transferred to a mental asylum because of the improper treatment he had received at the National Hospice.

In 1928, Febrônio was taken before a jury presided over by Judge Dr. Ary de Azevedo. His defense was executed by the lawyer Dr. Létacio Jansen, who sustained criminal inculpability in the face of his manifest madness. Febrônio was then examined by forensic psychiatrist Dr. Heitor Carrilho. Data collected from the interview appeared to indicate an imaginary mystic-delirious extravaganza by the inculturation of Febrônio, exemplified by his fixation on the maternal figure that, according to him, was called Estrella do Oriente Índio do Brasil. This data was compared with the information obtained by Agenor Ferreira de Mattos, Febrônio's brother, who lived in Jequié and had come to visit him. This proved that the defendant had falsified his testimony, either on purpose or due to pathological lying.

On February 20, 1928, Dr. Carrilho, aided by Dr. Manoel Clemente Reyio, finally issued an extensive expert report, which later became famous, from which the following conclusions were drawn:

1. Febrônio Índio do Brasil, is a bearer of a constitutional psychopathy, characterized by ethical deviations, covering the form of moral madness and instinctive perversions, expressed in homosexuality with sadistic impulses, a state that is joined by delirious ideas of the imaginary, mystical character.

2. His antisocial reactions or the criminal acts of which he is accused result from this morbid condition which prevents him from the normal use of his will.

3. Consequently, his imputation capacity is impaired or terminated.

4. It should be borne in mind, however, that the abnormal manifestations of his mentality are elements that define his inescapable fear, so he must therefore be segregated ad vitam for the salutary and elevated effects of social defense, establishment appropriate to delinquent psychopaths.

Armed with the powerful scientific arguments of this report, Dr. Jansen obtained acquittal, and Judge De Azevedo determined his recollection. Upon his incarceration on June 6, 1929, Febrônio became the first inmate of the Judiciary Nursery of Rio de Janeiro.

=== Escape, recapture and death ===
On February 8, 1935, Febrônio, taking advantage of the distraction caused by the arrival of morning shift employees, climbed the 4-meter high wall of the Judicial Asylum with a rope made of laced sheets ending in a hook made with bucket handles. His escape, however, lasted only until the following day, when Bernadino Barbosa went to the police station to report that Febrônio was hiding at his house in the Rio neighborhood of Honório Gurgel. Bernadino said that he had been lodged at the request of a friend, Agenor, Febrônio's brother. Bernadino decided to notify the police when, to his horror, he read about his guest's crimes and escape in the newspaper.

Febrônio, found totally naked, was returned to the Judicial Asylum, where he remained until his death on August 27, 1984, at the age of 89, caused by pulmonary emphysema. His body was discreetly buried on September 5, 1984, at the Caju Cemetery.

== Legacy ==
=== Cultural legacy ===
The life and crimes of Febrônio generated repercussions in the culture and influenced several artists.

==== Theater ====
The first cultural manifestation about the anti-juridical acts committed by Febrônio was the painting The Son of the Light, that was showcased in 1927 in the revue "I do not want to know more of her", by the company Ra-Ta-Plan.

The director Paulo Biscaia Filho produced the play DCVXVI - this is the Son of Light, with actor Clóvis Inocêncio in the role of Febrônio.

==== Literature ====
In 1927, when Febrônio's crimes often made headlines, an unknown author who signed as M. Splayne, possibly a pseudonym, wrote The crimes of the monster Febrônio, a collection of information obtained in the press and that barely disguised his condemnatory impetus.

In the same year, the Swiss poet Blaise Cendrars collected data on Febrônio during his stay in Brazil and obtained authoritzation to speak to him personally in the House of Detention. This material was developed into a series of critical articles in the French newspaper Paris Soir. In 1938, these were compiled in the chapter Febrônio (magic sexualis) of his book La vie dangereuse. Cendrars tried to correlate the crimes of Febrônio with his mixed race of African descent and the Brazilian tropical climate, in addition to describing the sensations he experienced when interviewing him.

Brazilian modernist authors, such as Antônio Castilho de Alcântara Machado, Aníbal Machado, Pedro Nava, Rubem Fonseca and Ruy Castro, also made references to Febrônio in their works.

More recently, company administrator Ilana Casoy wrote a chapter on Febrônio in her book Serial Killers: Made in Brazil. In addition, Carlos Augusto Machado Calil, a film professor at the University of São Paulo, has published a booklet titled The Book of Febrônio.

==== Music ====
Between 1928 and 1935, Febrônio was the theme of some carnival marches. One of them, "I went in the bush, Creole", authored by Gomes Júnior, has the following excerpt: "I went in the bush, / creole, / look for cipó, / Creole! / I saw an animal, / Creole, / with one eye! / It was not a bug, / it was nothing, / was the Febrón / of wide pants ".

==== Language and collective imagination ====
Febrônio was used in the 1930s as a bogeyman by parents who had the intention of frightening their disobedient children, with phrases such as "Be careful that Febrônio comes to get you!"

==== Cinema ====
In 1981, José Sette directed the feature film "Febrônio Índio do Brasil". In 1984, Silvio Da-Rin showcased an 11-minute duration reel, winning the best prize assembly at the Festival de Gramado in 1985 for AIDA Marques, with the 1985 winner for best photography going to Walter Carvalho.

==== Television ====
The program Linha Direta, on Rede Globo, dedicated their November 25, 2004 broadcast to the crimes committed by Febrônio, played in skits by actor Flavio Bauraqui. The episode included comments from specialists in Law and Medicine, among them Dr. Talvane Marins de Moraes, a forensic psychiatrist who accompanied Febrônio in his last years as an intern of the Heitor Carrilho Custody Hospital.

=== Legal legacy ===
The judgment of Febrônio Índio do Brasil was recognized as the triumph of scientific arguments about the cold letter of the law. It was the first Brazilian case in which medical science influenced a judicial decision in proving that the defendant was completely incapable of understanding the unlawful nature of the fact committed by him and should not therefore be penalized, since the agent nor would he understand the intimidatory and corrective intent of the repressive measure. Prevailing in the judgment of Febrônio the distinction between criminal and sick, something that occurred in France almost a century before, in 1835, in the case Piérre Rivière, who until then reigned a classical legal school, who judged the crime committed by someone equipped with free will, gave way to the positivist school, aimed at the man as an individual immersed in a socio-cultural environment, which allowed to inaugurate in the country the measure of security for criminals that are criminally incapable and endowed with lasting danger, aiming at the treatment of morbid condition and the prevention of recidivism, a principle definitively established in Brazilian legislation by the Penal Code of 1940.

Febrônio was also the first case in which science legitimized a perpetual social segregation in Brazil, since the mental illness that held the criminal understanding was permanent and progressive, with a low probability of cure. Unlike the Pierre Rivière case, whose diagnosis of monomania was enough just to commute his death penalty into life imprisonment, fulfilled in Beulieu Prison next to offenders without mental illness, which never received new psychiatric evaluations to her suicide by hanging, Febrônio was, during the entire period of his hospitalization in the custody hospital, regularly submitted to medical treatment and electroconvulsive therapy, aiming, always after periodic psychiatric exams, to prepare a medical report attesting his cure or the absence of dangerousness, which would enable him to be discharged from hospital and returned to normal life in society, or a medical report that would confirm the maintenance or aggravation of his mental illness, which would keep him, at least until the next examination, in the Judicial Asylum in the name of social defense.

=== Scientific legacy ===
Febrônio stimulated many academic productions, discussions in conferences and articles in scientific journals in the fields of Anthropology, Criminology, History, Literature, Psychology, Psychopathology and Sociology.

Medicine, especially psychiatry, has evolved, benefited in part by the interest aroused by the mystic-delirious ideas of Febrônio. At the time, it was routine to deal with people with mental illness using a strait jacket and thermal shock by bathing with water of different temperatures, with poor results for the rehabilitation of sanity. Thanks to the progress of Pharmacology and Neuroscience, currently patients with even more severe conditions are treated in an efficient way, which allows the extinction of dangerousness and the return to social life. This scientific development was only achieved in Brazil due to the seminal studies of psychiatrists Dr. Leonidio Ribeiro, Dr. Murillo Campos and Dr. Waldemar Berardinelli, who show that crime may be a clinical sign, sometimes the first and even the only one, of potentially curable mental illness.

The initial diagnosis of moral madness given to Febrônio by Dr. Heitor Carrilho, based on theories of Ernst Kretschmer, Sigmund Freud and James Pritchard, innovative for the first decades of the twentieth century, was reformed by forensic psychiatrist Dr. Talvane Marins de Moraes, who had the opportunity to study his psychic picture in private and in person. Thus, equipped with the most advanced diagnostic resources and modern psychopathological concepts, Dr. Moraes found that Febrônio had hebephrenic-paranoid schizophrenia.

== Filmography ==
- The Prince of Fire, a documentary by Silvio Da-Rin

== See also ==
- List of serial killers in Brazil
