= Douglas Baptista =

Brazilian serial killer

- Born: 1962 (age 63–64); São Paulo, Brazil
- Other name: "The São Vicente Maniac"
- Conviction: Murder x4
- Penalty: 18 years (2013); 30 years (2015); 30 years (2017)

Details
- Victims: 8+
- Span of crimes: 1992–2003
- Country: Brazil
- State: São Paulo
- Date apprehended: For the final time on December 18, 2015

Douglas Baptista (born 1962), known as The São Vicente Maniac (Portuguese: Maníaco de São Vicente), is a Brazilian serial killer who drowned at least eight children in the Baixada Santista metropolitan area from 1992 to 2003. Arrested and convicted for several of the crimes, he is currently serving a lengthy sentence.

== Crimes ==
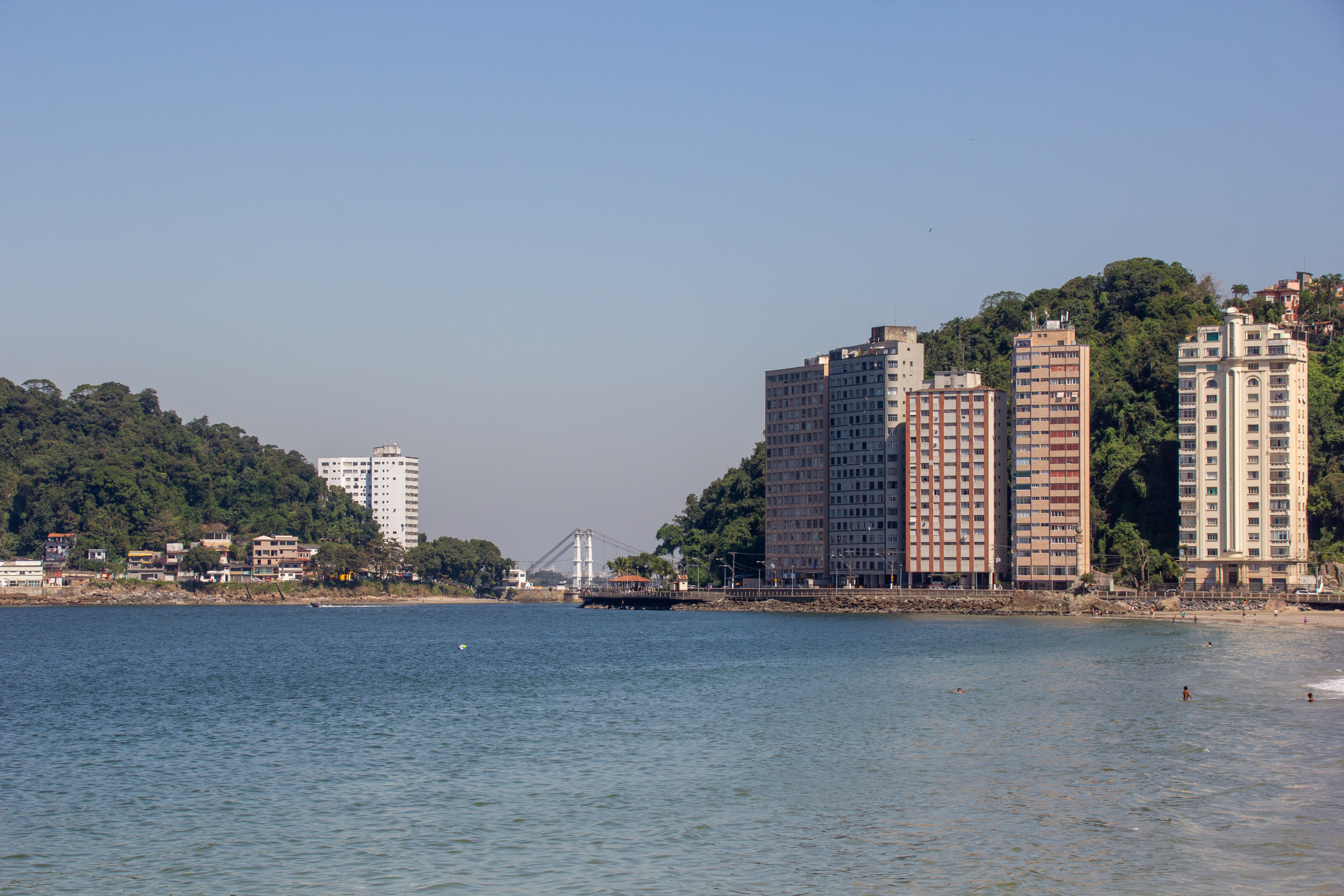
View of São Vicente, where most crimes took place

As victims, Baptista would choose poor children aged between five and twelve years of age. He would usually befriend the children's family members and often offered them gifts, but sometimes he would simply offer to take them on a walk or fishing trip.

When they arrived at a suitable location, Baptista would tie the victims up, likely rape them (thus far, rape could be proven only in one case, as semen was found in the victim's vagina) and throw them into a body of water - a river, mangrove or sea - and drown them. Other victims may also have been strangled.

=== Christmas murders ===
On Christmas Day in 2003, two girls disappeared from their homes in São Vicente. The victims were Nathaly Jenifer Ribeiro and Najila de Jesus, both five years old. Their bodies were found four days later floating in the Mambu River near Itanhaém, with both hands and feet tied. Authorities rigorously searched for the criminal at the time, but were unable to link any potential suspect.

== Investigation and arrest ==
Baptista was initially arrested for the murders in 2004, but despite confessing to them, he was not convicted and was released. Some time later, Baptista moved to Porto Alegre, where he lived for the next few years. In 2013, he was arrested for the murder of Fabiana dos Santos and sentenced to serve 18 years at the São Vicente Penitentiary for her murder, but was later paroled.

Eventually, authorities managed to connect Baptista to the Christmas murders and arrested him at his home in Praia Grande on December 8, 2015. He reportedly attempted to flee after seeing the police cars, but was cut off and apprehended. After he was taken into custody, Baptista initially claimed that he did not know he was sought by police and claimed that he was innocent, but eventually confessed and revealed that he had killed six other children, including his stepdaughter, and later showed where he had disposed of the bodies. When pressed for a motive, Baptista claimed that he "felt pleasure in seeing the victims struggling when they were drowning" and was possessed by a strange force.

== Trial and investigation ==
Before his trial would start, Baptista was examined by psychiatrist Guido Palomba, who concluded that he was abnormal and "absolutely unrecoverable." After this, he was put on trial for the murders of Ribeiro and De Jesus, was swiftly convicted, and subsequently sentenced to 30 years imprisonment. Two years later, in August 2017, he was given an additional 30-year sentence for the murder of Priscila Elias Inácio.

== Imprisonment ==
Currently, Baptista is kept in isolation from other inmates due to the severity of his crimes and due to fears that he would be killed by fellow inmates.

=== Proposal of bill ===
After the discovery of Baptista's crimes, a bill was created to typify serial murder. The proposal established that at least three crimes with the same modus operandi as a serial crime and proposed a full 30-year sentence without the chance of parole. The proposal was eventually shelved.

== Known victims ==
- Luana Elias Inácio, 9, killed on March 21, 1996; body found in a river in Praia Grande
- Priscila Elias Inácio (Luana's sister), 8, killed on October 29, 1997; body found in an inlet in São Vicente
- Vanessa (Baptista's stepdaughter), 12
- Fabiana Silva dos Santos, 9, body never found
- Sabrina, 10, and Leandro, 9, cousins who were kidnapped while en route to school
- Nathaly Ribeiro and Najila de Jesus, both 5, killed in December 2003; bodies located on December 29 in Mambu River; Ribeiro had been raped

== In media and culture ==
Baptista's crimes were covered on the crime show Investigação Criminal.

== See also ==
- List of serial killers in Brazil
