= Adriano Vicente da Silva =

Brazilian serial killer and rapist

- Born: 1980 (age 45–46); Paraná, Brazil
- Other names: "The Monster of Passo Fundo" "Bruxo"; Gabriel Vicente da Silva
- Conviction: Murder x10
- Penalty: 264 years imprisonment

Details
- Victims: 10–13
- Span of crimes: 2001–2004
- Country: Brazil
- States: Paraná, Rio Grande do Sul
- Date apprehended: For the final time on January 6, 2004
- Imprisoned at: Charqueadas High Security Penitentiary

Adriano Vicente da Silva (born 1980), known as The Monster of Passo Fundo (Portuguese: Monstro de Passo Fundo), is a Brazilian serial killer and rapist who killed at least nine children and one man in Rio Grande do Sul from 2001 to 2004. Convicted on all counts, he was sentenced to 264 years imprisonment for these crimes.

== Early life ==
A native of Paraná, Da Silva would later claim that he dropped out of school after the fifth grade, started practicing Muay Thai at age 10 and was known for his aggressiveness and cruelty to animals. At age 12, he was sexually abused by a neighbor, and two years after that, his parents separated, causing him great emotional turmoil.

Da Silva claimed that he first got the "urge" to kill at age 15, when he attacked a classmate, but failed in his attempt and the boy survived.

== Murders ==
Sometime in 2001, Da Silva was arrested for robbing and killing a taxi driver in União da Vitória, for which he was sentenced to 27 years imprisonment. After escaping from the prison he was detained at, he fled to Rio Grande do Sul, where he found work as a handyman.

Between August 2002 and January 2004, Da Silva carried out at least twelve attacks on young boys aged from 8 to 14. His modus operandi consisted of offering them money or popsicles and then luring them to forested areas, where he beat them using his martial arts skills and then sexually violated them. Ultimately, he strangled his victims with a rope. All of his attacks took place in the interior of the state, specifically in the cities of Passo Fundo, Sananduva, Soledade and Lagoa Vermelha.

== Investigation and arrest ==
Even after several similar murders of young boys occurred in the region, investigations advanced only in November 2003, when a witness reported seeing one of the victims being accompanied by an older man before disappearing. The police eventually identified the man as da Silva, but he presented them a false birth certificate in the name of Gabriel Vicente da Silva. Since this identity had no criminal record or active arrest warrants, he was released, but was photographed before leaving the police station.

While searching for information about "Gabriel", investigators from Rio Grande do Sul found a man who worked in the state of Paraná who supposedly was connected to him and later identified as Da Silva's brother. The officers dispatched there brought with them the photograph, and when it was shown to their colleagues in Paraná, they identified the man as Adriano da Silva, a prison escapee with a prior murder conviction.

Soon afterwards, police spread wanted posters across several cities in Rio Grande do Sul and asked several news media publications to spread the information. As a result, da Silva was arrested on January 6, 2004, in Machadinho, while attempting to flee to Santa Catarina. Just three days prior, he had killed his final known victim.

During a reconstruction of the crime scenes, da Silva indicated the precise locations of the victims' bodies, and when semen samples were taken from two of them, his DNA was conclusively linked to his genetic profile. As a result, several teenagers who were detained for some of the murders were released, with some of them claiming that they had been tortured into confessing by police officers.

== Trial and imprisonment ==
Although da Silva confessed to twelve murders in total, the Public Prosecutor's Office indicted him only in nine cases, as they were unable to conclusively prove his guilt for the disappearances of three boys in Soledade. Da Silva was subsequently charged with murder; concealment of a corpse; indecent assault; rape; identity theft and theft.

During a psychological evaluation, the examining psychiatrist asked da Silva if he felt any remorse. In response, da Silva replied that he felt remorse only for the first victim, but could not satiate his bloodlust and wanted to kill more, claiming that he even considered dismembering the bodies at one point.

Due to his lack of remorse and large amount of physical evidence implicating him, da Silva was found guilty of all the crimes in a 5-year span and given a combined sentence of 264 years imprisonment. As of October 2022, he is detained at the Charqueadas High Security Penitentiary.

== Confirmed victims ==
- Éderson Leite, age 12: killed August 16, 2002
- Douglas Oliveira Hass, age 10: killed April 2003
- Volnei Siqueira dos Santos, aged 12: killed July 9, 2003
- Alessandro Silveira, age 13: killed September 2003
- Junior Reis Loureiro, age 10: killed September 2003
- Jéferson Borges Silveira, age 11: killed September 2003
- Leandro Dornelles dos Santos, age 8: killed October 2003
- Luciano Rodrigues, age 9: killed November 2003
- Daniel Bernardi Lourenço, age 14: killed January 3, 2004

== See also ==
- List of serial killers in Brazil
