= Edson Izidoro Guimarães =

Brazilian serial killer

- Born: Edson Izidoro Guimarães; 1957 (age 68–69); Brazil
- Other name: The Nurse of Death
- Conviction: Murder
- Penalty: 76 years in prison

Details
- Victims: 4–131
- Span of crimes: January – May 1999
- Country: Brazil
- Date apprehended: May 4, 1999

Edson Isidoro Guimarães (born 1957) is a Brazilian nursing assistant and convicted serial killer. He confessed to five murders of which he was convicted of four, but is suspected of committing up to 131 in total. He claimed that he chose patients whose conditions were irreversible and who were in pain.

== Crimes ==
Guimarães worked as a nurse in the Salgado Filho Hospital in the Méier district of Rio de Janeiro, Brazil. He was caught in 1999 when a hospital porter saw Guimarães fill a syringe with potassium chloride and inject a comatose patient who immediately died. The police were informed and a higher than average death rate on his ward increased their suspicions. On his arrest he confessed to five murders. He told a television reporter prior to his trial, "I don't regret what I did", adding "I did it to those in irreversible comas and whose families were suffering."

He was convicted on February 21, 2000, of the murders of four patients and sentenced to 76 years in prison. He is thought to have killed up to 131 patients between January 1 and May 4, 1999. He told reporters: "The oxygen mask was taken away, yes. There were five patients that this happened to... I chose the patients I saw suffering, generally patients with AIDS, patients who were almost terminal. I am in peace because the patients were in a coma and had no way of recovering."

One possible motive for the murders is thought to be the fact that he was paid $60 a time to inform local funeral homes of a patient's death so that they could contact the deceased's relatives. According to Josias Quintal, Rio's secretary for public security, "He may have begun doing it to earn money and then just lost control".

== See also ==
- Abraão José Bueno - Brazilian nurse found guilty of 4 murders
- List of serial killers in Brazil
- List of medical and pseudo-medical serial killers
- Skin Hunters - four Polish nurses and doctors in Łódź who killed patients and then informed local funeral homes in return for a fee
