= Paulo José Lisboa =

Brazilian serial killer (1967–2022)

- Born: 1967; Brazil
- Died: February 4, 2022 (aged 54–55); Guarapari, Espírito Santo, Brazil
- Other name: "The Chain Maniac"
- Conviction: Murder x11
- Penalty: 18 years 11 years

Details
- Victims: 11
- Span of crimes: 1980s–2000
- Country: Brazil
- States: São Paulo, Espírito Santo
- Date apprehended: For the final time on September 16, 2008

Paulo José Lisboa (1967 – February 4, 2022), known as The Chain Maniac (Portuguese: Maníaco da Corrente), was a Brazilian serial killer who was convicted of killing eleven prostitutes in São Paulo and Espírito Santo from 1980 to 2000, with the latter killings occurring while he was a fugitive.

Convicted and sentenced to 9 years imprisonment for the latter crimes, he was released in 2017 and left on supervision until his death.

== Crimes ==
Lisboa, then a pharmaceutical salesman, committed his first crimes in the city of São José do Rio Preto between the 1980s and 1990s, where he was convicted of killing five people and beating up six others, for which he was given 18 years imprisonment. After serving only a part of his sentence, he managed to escape from the Franco da Rocha Psychiatric Prison in 1998 and fled to Espírito Santo, from where he intended to move to Bahia. However, Lisboa fell in love with a local woman whom he later married and had two children with, eventually settling in the state. This did not deter him from committing crimes, and during this time, he is known to have committed six further murders and two attempted murders in the Greater Vitória region.

His modus operandi was to arrange meetings with prostitutes, who were either young women or transvestites, whom he would assault as soon as they arrived on the scene using either a knife or latch, strangling his victims with the latter. However, as he usually used a chain to ultimately kill his victims, he became known by the pseudonym 'The Chain Maniac'.

While little is publicly known about his victims' identities, two of them were identified as 15-year-old Aline Melo, stabbed 47 times on Christmas Day in 1987, as well as a transvestite named Paulo Constantino, who went by the name "Paulinha".

== Arrest, trial and sentencing ==
After being on the run for 10 years, Lisboa was arrested in Vitória on September 16, 2008. He admitted full responsibility for the crimes, explaining how he killed his victims, claiming that he had picked on prostitutes because they were "easy targets." A psychiatric examination conducted on Lisboa concluded that he was a "social psychopath".

Following his conviction in 2011, Justice Daniel Peçanha Moreira sentenced him to ten years imprisonment in a closed-regime prison. Lisboa served from 2008 to 2017, when he was paroled under supervision.

== Death ==
After his release from prison, Lisboa remarried and moved to Guarapari, where he avoided interacting with his neighbors. His decomposing corpse was found at the couple's home on February 4, 2022, by his wife, who had just returned home from visiting some relatives in Vila Velha. So far, coroners have been unable to establish a cause of death.

== See also ==
- List of serial killers in Brazil
