= Tiago Henrique Gomes da Rocha =

Brazilian serial killer

- Born: Tiago Henrique Gomes da Rocha; 4 February 1988 (age 38); Goiânia, Brazil
- Penalty: 25 years

Details
- Victims: 11 convicted 39 claimed
- Span of crimes: 2011–2014
- Country: Brazil
- State: Goiás
- Date apprehended: October 2014

This article uses a Portuguese surname: his surname is Gomes da Rocha, not Rocha.

Tiago Henrique Gomes da Rocha (born 4 February 1988) is a Brazilian former security guard and serial killer who has claimed to have killed 39 people. He approached his victims on a motorbike and shouted "robbery" before shooting them. However, he never took anything. He targeted homeless people, women and homosexuals in Goiás. Sixteen of his victims were female, with the youngest being a 14-year-old girl whom he killed in January 2014.

Gomes da Rocha was arrested after being caught riding a motorbike with a fake plate. He earlier caught the attention of police after they discovered that he was facing trial for stealing the number plate off a motorbike at a supermarket in Goiânia in January 2014. A motorbike, stolen plates and the suspected murder weapon, a .38 revolver, were retrieved from a home he shared with his mother. He attempted suicide in his prison cell on 16 October 2014 by slashing his wrists with a smashed light bulb. Gomes da Rocha has claimed to have had murderous urges since age 11, when he was sexually abused by a neighbor.

In May 2016, he was convicted of 11 murders and sentenced to 25 years in prison.

== See also ==
- List of serial killers in Brazil
- List of serial killers by number of victims
