= Ademir Oliveira Rosário =

Brazilian serial killer and rapist

- Born: 1971 (age 54–55); São Paulo, Brazil
- Other name: "The Cantareira Maniac"
- Convictions: Murder x2 Manslaughter; Theft; Indecent assault
- Penalty: 57 years (2007); Acquittal on grounds of insanity (1991)

Details
- Victims: 3
- Span of crimes: 1991–2007
- Country: Brazil
- State: São Paulo
- Date apprehended: For the final time on September 29, 2007

Ademir Oliveira Rosário (born 1971), known as The Cantareira Maniac (Portuguese: Maníaco da Cantareira), is a Brazilian serial killer and serial rapist who gained notoriety for murdering two teenagers in 2007. The crimes were committed after his release on probation from a psychiatric clinic, where he had been interned for a 1991 manslaughter conviction and other charges. For the latter crimes, he was convicted and sentenced to 57 years imprisonment.

== Early life ==
Born in 1971 in São Paulo in a family with seven other siblings, Oliveira's childhood was described as reportedly normal, despite being born deaf and mute. However, according to one of his sisters, he started to exhibit unstable and bizarre behavior as a teenager, but did not cause any major disruptions to his family members.

By the early 1990s, he started doing criminal activities, beginning with a conviction for theft in 1990. The following year, Oliveira killed a man during a dispute, but was acquitted on the grounds of insanity and sent to a psychiatric hospital in Taubaté. Despite being diagnosed as a dangerous sexual predator, he was lodged into a semi-open regime that allowed him to go on the outside. During one such outing in 1998, he assaulted two boys and committed a robbery and was again returned to the hospital, but no stricter regime was imposed on him.

== Release and sexual assaults ==
In the early 2000s, Oliveira was transferred to a psychiatric hospital in Franco da Rocha, where he was eventually given permission to leave on November 25, 2006. After his release, he moved back to São Paulo and got into a relationship with Elson José Messaggi, a homosexual pai-de-santo who had been diagnosed with HIV since 1997. Like Oliveira, Messaggi was attracted to teenagers aged 14 to 15, whom he often lured to nearby forests with offers of sex in exchange for candy and soft drinks.

By March of the following year, Oliveira started staking out hiking trails along the Serra da Cantareira mountain range, singling out male teenagers that were unaccompanied by adults. If the opportunity arose, he would threaten them at knifeponint and force them to commit sexual acts on him, and would sometimes even rape his victims. In total, it is believed that he did this to approximately 21 victims from March to September, and reportedly acted alone.

=== Double murder, investigation, and arrest ===
On September 22, two brothers from Jardim Paraná, 14-year-old Francisco de Oliveira Neto and 13-year-old Josenildo José de Oliveira, went to the nearby woods to pick up some fruits for their mother. When they failed to return, their mother contacted the police, who launched a search and rescue operation. Three days later, the two teenagers' naked bodies were found in a forest in northern São Paulo. Initially, it was suggested that they might have gotten lost and died in an accident, but authorities did not exclude the possibility of foul play.

Upon further inspection, it was determined that both had been stabbed and possibly sexually assaulted, as coroners located puncture wounds from a sharp object on both of their bodies. Now considered a homicide investigation, detectives quickly learned that only a day prior to the brothers' disappearance, another trio of boys had been attacked, but managed to escape. When interrogated, they described their assailant as a young black man with a scar on his face and a shaved head, who was possibly deaf-mute. They eventually tracked down a brother of Oliveira, who told them that he was currently incarcerated at a psychiatric hospital for a violent indecent assault.

While this would have eliminated him as a suspect, further investigation uncovered that he was allowed probation on weekends, allowing him to possibly commit such heinous acts. When presented with a photograph of Oliveira, the three teenagers positively identified him as their assailant. Soon afterwards, Oliveira was arrested and immediately admitted responsibility, but claimed that he had blacked out and could not remember what happened too clearly. He claimed that he remembered stabbing Josenildo to death, but claimed that his partner, Messaggi, was the one who had killed Francisco. Due to this, Messaggi was also detained, but vehemently denied his supposed role in the murders.

In contrast to his claims, however, an examination of Oliveira's cell phone, which contained numerous photographs of underaged young men, also contained a photo that put Messaggi in the forest on the same day when the brothers disappeared. Some of Oliveira's surviving victims also claimed that he was sometimes accompanied by another man who resembled Messaggi.

== Trial and imprisonment ==
Before he was due to stand trial, Oliveira underwent a psychiatric evaluation headed by renowned psychiatrist Guido Palomba. Palomba would later conclude that Oliveira exhibited psychopathic tendencies and was "completely abnormal", but still ruled that he was sane to stand trial.

His trial began in March 2012. During the proceedings, Oliveira claimed that he "wanted to have an affair" with the younger brother, claiming that he had completely blacked out when Josenildo refused his advances on him. He also denied raping and killing Francisco, pinning it completely on Messaggi. Due to this, his attorney, Marcos Figueiredo Martins, pleaded with the judge to have his client acquitted on the grounds of insanity and thereafter transferred to a mental health institution, arguing that he could not possibly have been in a stable mind when he had committed the murders.

In a rebuttal to that assessment, prosecutor Eduardo Campana pointed out that the psychiatric reports indicated that Oliveira was sane at the time of the crimes and thus fully culpable for his actions. In the end, he was found guilty on two counts of rape and murder, and was sentenced to 57 years imprisonment. For his alleged role in the crimes, Messaggi had already been convicted for participating in Josenildo's death in 2009 and was sentenced to 31 years imprisonment, but has continued to appeal the sentence, professing his innocence.

Shortly after Oliveira's arrest, an investigation into the practises at the Franco da Rocha hospital established that there were numerous irregularities, including understaffing and lack of proper storage for the inmates' medicine.

== See also ==
- List of serial rapists
- List of serial killers in Brazil
