= Gomes da Rocha =

Gomes da Rocha is a Portuguese surname. Notable persons with that name include:

- Tiago Henrique Gomes da Rocha (born 1988), Brazilian serial killer
- Francielle Gomes da Rocha (born 1992), Brazilian handball player
- Francisco Gomes da Rocha (1754–1808), Brazilian classical composer
