= Roneys Fon Firmino Gomes =

Brazilian serial killer

- Born: 1975 (age 50–51); Brazil
- Other name: "The Tower Maniac"
- Conviction: Murder
- Penalty: 21 years imprisonment

Details
- Victims: 6+
- Span of crimes: 2005–2015
- Country: Brazil
- State: Paraná
- Date apprehended: July 30, 2015

Roneys Fon Firmino Gomes, known as the Tower Maniac, is a Brazilian serial killer who, after killing his victims (mainly prostitutes), left their bodies underneath high-voltage electrical towers.

He operated in the city of Maringá, Paraná, between the years 2005 (possibly 2001, according to O Diário) and 2015, and he is considered by the state's police to be among their deadliest serial killers.

He was arrested on July 30, 2015, after police found traces of some materials around the body of the victim Mara Josiane dos Santos, who was discovered three days earlier.

The case was reported in the Jornal Nacional on Rede Globo.

== Biography ==
Roneys was married, a father of two children, and worked as a security guard and freelance salesman. His mother, who was a prostitute, was murdered in the town of Campo Mourão when he was seven years old, after which he began living near electric towers.

He had already had previous convictions for fraud and bank robbery, and was 40 years old at the time of his arrest.

== Crimes ==
Police were already working on the possibility of a serial killer in the area, having mapped all deaths in similar circumstances over a number of years, but it was only after finding the body of Mara Josiane dos Santos on July 27, 2015, did they arrive at Roneys', after finding traces and video images that put him at the crime scene.

In a statement, the killer, in addition to detailing some deaths, claimed he had killed five other women, but police believe the number of victims is higher.

After the arrest, other women testified and confirmed that Roneys had attempted to kill other prostitutes, including a transvestite.

Roneys was found guilty for six murders and concealment of corpses.

=== Investigation and capture ===
Investigators found Mara Josiane's clothes three kilometers away from where the body was. Next to them, the police found pieces of a blue car's bumper. According to examinations, the suspect had a blue vehicle whose bumper was damaged. The pieces that were in the authorities' possession fit perfectly in the damaged section. In addition, a traffic camera had caught the car on the day and place where the woman was killed. It was with these indications that the police requested the arrest of Roneys.

==== Roneys' testimony ====
When arrested, Roneys said that after agreeing to go with Mara, he followed her into a dark street. There, they took their clothes off inside the car, but the two had a disagreement over the use of a condom, after which Mara had tried to take away the keys to the vehicle. Fearing arrest, Roneys checked for any nearby traffic in case she began running naked, before eventually strangling Mara to death.

After ensuring she was dead, Roneys claimed to have followed a corn farmer to a nearby high-voltage tower where he intended to leave the body, but as he saw movement of vehicles near the scene, he changed his mind. For this reason, he only left part of Mara's clothes there before driving for about a mile to another farm, leaving the victim in a cornfield, where he "arranged" the body and prayed "asking for forgiveness for his act and the victim".

Regarding the choice of victims, Roneys claimed that they were selected at random.

He also clarified details such as: to avoid being scratched, which could leave traces on the nails, he laid on the car seat in such a way as to hinder the victim's reaction; stalked his targets; generally killed prostitutes who refused to do what he wanted; followed the cases on TV; all of the women's bodies could be found in the area of the tower located in Estrada da Roseira, and if the place was too "overcrowded", he would dispose of the bodies elsewhere.

== Motive ==
According to his statement, Roneys had a "hatred of prostitutes" because his mother was one and had also been murdered, without the perpetrator being arrested, which caused him severe trauma. After her death, he began living near electrical towers.

== Modus operandi ==
He killed by strangling or asphyxiating the women, leaving their bodies naked and belly up, always in the middle of plantations and under electric towers.

== Victims ==
Edinalva José da Paz: killed at age 19 by asphyxiation, her body was discovered on December 7, 2010. Roneys did not admit to this murder, but the victim's phone was found to be in possession of one of the killer's friends.

Mara Josiane dos Santos: 36 years old, strangled. Her body was found on July 27, 2015. It was along with Mara's clothes that police found a piece of Roneys' car, leading to his arrest.

Roseli Maria de Souza: 31 years old, strangled. Her body was found in July 2014.

Silmara Aparecida de Melo: strangled to death in 2012.

Jane Doe: an unidentified victim's body was found on August 19, 2013, killed by stabbing.

== Judgement and penalties ==
The first case in Maringá on March 14, 2019, was that of Edinalva, who died in 2010. The defendant answered for the crimes of double-qualified homicide (through asphyxiation and through concealment, since he would have deceived the victim by saying that they would it sexual) and corpse concealment.

In the case of Mara Josiane, the defendant was responsible for concealment of the corpse and for murder with four qualifications: clumsy motive, asphyxia, dissimulation (appeal that made the victim's defense difficult) and femicide.

In total, Roneys was convicted for six murders and concealment of corpses.

Roneys will face more trials during Summer 2020 for the murders of Mara Josiane dos Santos and Roseli Maria de Souza.

=== Penalties ===
Edinalva case: the defendant was sentenced to 21 years and four months imprisonment for crimes of qualified homicide and concealment of a corpse.

== See also ==
- List of serial killers in Brazil
