= Abraão José Bueno =

Brazilian serial killer

- Born: Abraão José Bueno; 30 November 1976 (age 49); Brazil
- Convictions: Murder, Attempted murder
- Penalty: 110 years of imprisonment

Details
- Victims: 4
- Country: Brazil

Abraão José Bueno (born 30 November 1976) is a Brazilian nurse and serial killer. In 2005 he was sentenced to 110 years imprisonment for the murder of four children and the attempted murder of another four.

== Crimes ==
Bueno worked as a nurse in the Instituto de Puericultura Martagão Gesteira of the Federal University of Rio de Janeiro (UFRJ) in Rio de Janeiro, Brazil.

In 2005 Bueno, working in a children's ward, began injecting babies and older children with overdoses of sedatives, causing them to stop breathing. He would then call medical staff to resuscitate them. In the course of one month up to fifteen children are thought to have been targeted, all between the ages of one and ten. Many suffered from AIDS and leukaemia.

Bueno was arrested November 11, 2005. On 15 May 2008 he was found guilty by judge Valéria Caldi on four counts of murder and four counts of attempted murder. He was sentenced to 110 years in total.

It is thought that Bueno committed his crimes so that he could be the first to notice a problem with a patient, thereby earning the respect and admiration of his co-workers.

== See also ==
- Edson Isidoro Guimarães - Brazilian nurse found guilty of four murders
- List of serial killers in Brazil
