= Marcelo Costa de Andrade =

Brazilian serial killer (born 1967)

- Born: January 2, 1967 (age 59); Rio de Janeiro, United States of Brazil
- Other name: "The Vampire of Niterói"
- Conviction: Murder
- Penalty: Committed to a psychiatric hospital

Details
- Victims: 14 known and confirmed
- Span of crimes: April – December 1991
- Country: Brazil
- State: Rio de Janeiro
- Date apprehended: December 18, 1991

Marcelo Costa de Andrade (born January 2, 1967) is a Brazilian serial killer who murdered 14 boys in the vicinity of Itaboraí, about 30 kilometers from Niterói, Rio de Janeiro, in 1991.

== Early life ==
Andrade lived for a part of his childhood in Rocinha, a favela in Rio de Janeiro. His mother, a maid, was abused by her husband. He was sent to his grandparents' house in Ceará for some time, where he claimed to have earned a lot of money. After a while, he was sent back to Rio de Janeiro, where he was mistreated by new companions of his separated parents. It was during this time that he was sexually abused by an older man.

Andrade was then admitted to a boys' school, but did not perform well in class. There he was harassed by his classmate, who called him retarded. When he was 14, he was kicked out because the institution only sheltered boys of ages between 6 and 14.

As soon as Andrade left the boarding school, he began to prostitute himself. According to him, he was always active during the acts, but once an older man forced him to be passive, which disturbed him a lot. At that time, he tried to commit suicide. Some time later, he was sent to FEBEM, but months later he fled and went back into prostitution. At the age of 16, he went to live with another homosexual, Antônio Batista Freire, who began supporting Andrade, even introducing him to the Universal Church of the Kingdom of God. Even with his companion's support, Andrade continued to prostitute himself, until he finally separated from Freire and returned to his family's home.

From there, he abandoned prostitution and began to work formally, helping the family with bills and the household chores. Andrade attended the Kingdom of God's services for about ten years at the time, in addition to watching the daily TV celebrations. According to him, it was in one of those cults that he heard that when children die, they go to heaven. Judging by this logic, he did not kill adults, because he could be sending them to hell.

When he was not reading the preachings of Bishop Edir Macedo, he was reading pornographic magazines. He liked to listen to Xuxa's songs, along with other children's idols at the time. Andrade's mother even said that he had the strange habit of listening to a tape recording of his brother crying.

== Discovery of crimes ==
On December 16, 1991, 10-year-old Altair Medeiros de Abreu left with his brother Ivan to visit the house of a neighbor, who had promised to offer them lunch. At the time, the pre-adolescent lived in the impoverished district of Santa Isabel in São Gonçalo, neighboring the municipality of Niterói. The two were the children of Zélia de Abreu, a maid who had five other children.

When the two boys passed through the central station of Niterói, they were approached by Andrade, who, according to Altair, offered them about four thousand cruzeiros if they helped him perform a Catholic religious ritual. The three of them took a bus and got off at a deserted beach on the outskirts of the Barreto Viaduct. At that moment, Andrade tried to kiss the older boy, who fled scared, but was then captured and knocked to the ground; stunned, he watched as his brother Ivan was sexually abused by Andrade who, after strangling him, told Altair that his brother was asleep.

Scared, Altair started to do everything Andrade wanted, and was then taken by the murderer to a gas station, where he wiped himself while being observed by the attendant. The two slept in the thicket, and the next morning they left for Rio de Janeiro. It is said that during the journey, Andrade offered to live with Altair, who agreed immediately. During the later testimonies, Andrade said that he became merciful towards to the boy, because he was being "good" and promised to stay with him. At the time, Andrade worked as a pamphlet distributor, and would have to appear at work to get said pamphlets. As soon as he had distracted himself, Altair took the chance and fled from the killer.

Altair initially did not reveal that his brother had been killed, only telling of the crime to the older sisters the following day. Andrade did not try to look for Altair or try to hide his brother's body, instead returning to the crime scene to change the body's position, before it was discovered by police officers hours later. It is said that the boy's hands were inside his shorts, which removed the initial thesis of drowning, and sexual abuse was later verified by the authorities. When the body was identified by Ivan's mother, Altair led the cops to Andrade, who confessed to the crime immediately, showing no surprise.

== Confessions ==
At the police station, Andrade confessed to killing thirteen other boys, revealing one of his first crimes. According to him, in June 1991, he had just gotten off a bus when he saw 11-year-old Odair Jose Muniz dos Santos, begging for alms in the street. He managed to convince the boy that he would go with him to an aunt's house and get about 3000 cruzeiros. But in fact, he lured Odair to a soccer field where he tried to abuse him, and when he couldn't, he strangled the boy.

I did not notice if he was alive or dead when I ravished him. I could not satisfy myself, and I squeezed his throat once more to make sure his soul went to Heaven.

Soon after, Andrade went home for dinner and came back later, when he decapitated the boy's body. He stated that he did this to take revenge on what they did with him during his time at the boarding school. His first murder occurred in April 1991, when he was coming home from work and saw a boy selling sweets on the avenue. He used the same story of money and religious rituals and took the boy to the thicket. He tried to have sex with the boy, but he resisted. Andrade attacked him with some stones, stifling and then raping him. Since then, he could no longer stop himself from committing murders. In his second murder, that of 11-year-old Anderson Gomes Goulart, he used a stone to beat his victim over the head. He would keep some of Goulart's blood in a bowl to drink from later.

== Institutionalization ==
Andrade was charged and was ultimately declared insane and sent to Henrique Roxo Psychiatric Hospital.

== See also ==
- List of serial killers in Brazil
