= Guarulhos Strangler =

Unidentified Brazilian serial killer

- Other name: "The Guarulhos Maniac"

Details
- Victims: 8
- Span of crimes: 2001–2002
- Country: Brazil
- State: São Paulo
- Date apprehended: N/A

The Guarulhos Strangler (Portuguese: Estrangulador de Guarulhos) is an unidentified Brazilian serial killer who raped ten women in the city of Guarulhos from 2001 to 2002, strangling to death eight of his victims. Two men were arrested as suspects but were later released, leaving all the cases unsolved.

== Murders ==
=== 2001 ===
The first confirmed victim was 24-year-old Elisângela Nicolau dos Santos, a homemaker who was found strangled with a purse strap inside her home in Jardim Santa Rita on 17 July 2001. The killer then stole a TV and a clothes iron from the house and fled.

On 26 October, a man broke into the home of a 21-year-old woman, known only by the initials "VRS", whom he then raped and attempted to strangle with a yellow cloth. The victim fainted, but the attacker did not notice this and proceeded to steal a TV. The woman was found later that noon by a concerned neighbor, suffering from a nosebleed, and was immediately rushed to the Pérola Byington Hospital for treatment. She survived the ordeal and described what had happened, claiming that the assailant had laughed and mocked her during the assault. Shortly after providing testimony, she left Guarulhos and moved to another state.

On 19 November, 18-year-old student Joice Rodrigues dos Santos was strangled to death with a purse strap at her home in Jardim Eliana. Like the previous attacks, the killer stole a TV set.

The last known attack in 2001 took place on 27 November, when the Strangler approached a 29-year-old woman, known by the initials "ASAR", and presented himself as someone who was interested in buying her property. Even though the victim did not allow him to enter the residence, he forced his way in and pushed her to the kitchen, where he started strangling the woman. However, he was scared off by the arrival of her brother-in-law, prompting the Strangler to flee.

From December 2001 to April 2002, he has not been linked to any known crimes.

=== 2002 ===
The Strangler resumed his killing spree on 2 May 2002, when he murdered 13-year-old Eleonilda da Silva Lira. This was followed up by 31-year-old homemaker Maria Augusta da Silva on 9 June, who was strangled with a blouse inside the living room of her house in Jardim Santa Rita. Curiously, nothing was stolen from her residence, unlike the previous victims.

The next victim was 23-year-old Maria Noêmia Silvia de Moraes, who was strangled with a bedsheet on 26 June. A stereo had been stolen from her home. After this, the Strangler killed 22-year-old Cleziária Tavares de Sales at her home in Vila Airosa on 3 July, using a piece of cloth taken from a T-shirt. He then left the body in the bedroom and covered it up with a blanket, with it later being discovered by her daughter. When Tavares' husband Antonio returned, their daughter informed him that her mother was "sleeping", prompting him to go to the bedroom to inform her that he had just found a new job. To his shock, he found that his wife had been murdered and that a stereo had been stolen from their residence.

The seventh victim, 25-year-old Ivaneide Miranda de Queiroz, was found bound and dead on the floor of her house on 22 July, having been strangled with a green blouse. The final known victim of the Strangler, 25-year-old Cleonice Da Silva Martins, was raped and strangled with a dish towel on 19 August in Jardim Flórida.

== Investigation ==
In an attempt to capture the killer, the Guarulhos Police Department enlisted the help of writer Ilana Casoy, who specialized in studying serial killers based in Brazil. According to her analysis, the Strangler would likely change his modus operandi if the cases continued, but would almost certainly never change his signature of killing his victims using certain items such as clothing or bag straps.

According to descriptions provided by the surviving victims, the Strangler appeared to be a bespectacled white male in his late 20s or early 30s and was approximately 1.65 meters tall. He always attacked at noon and used some kind of ruse to enter the victims' domiciles, usually by pretending to be an employee of the water, electricity, or sewage treatment company, and sometimes by claiming that he was interested in buying their house. In almost all of the crime scenes, at least one item had been stolen, usually an electronic device of some kind or a TV.

One psychologist speculated that the Strangler enjoyed reliving the experience of seeing his victims suffer, and due to this, he proposed that he also attended their funerals.

=== Suspects ===
On two occasions in late 2002, police arrested two unnamed suspects that they initially believed could be the killer. The first occurred on 18 September, when a man from Piracaia was arrested and authorities found pornographic magazines, a rope, and women's scarves in his backpack. The man was taken to the police station for identification, but as the victims did not recognize him, he was released.

Three months later, on 30 December, police detained another man in Guarulhos after an anonymous tip accused him of being the Strangler. When searched, the man was found to be in possession of pornographic magazines and women's underwear, and like the previous suspect, he was taken to the police station for identification. However, similarly to the first suspect, he was also not recognized by the victims and released.

Since then, there have been no further arrests in the case, which remains cold.

== See also ==
- List of serial killers in Brazil
