= Sebastião Antônio de Oliveira =

Brazilian pedophile and serial killer

- Born: October 7, 1915 or 1916; Tuiuti or Amparo, São Paulo, Brazil
- Died: January 7, 1976 (age 59 or 60); Campinas Prison, Campinas, Brazil
- Cause of death: Suicide by hanging
- Other name: "The Monster of Bragança"
- Conviction: N/A
- Penalty: N/A

Details
- Victims: 5
- Span of crimes: 1953–1975
- Country: Brazil
- State: São Paulo
- Date apprehended: For the final time in 1975

Sebastião Antônio de Oliveira (October 7, 1915 or 1916 – January 7, 1976), known as The Monster of Bragança, was a Brazilian rapist and serial killer who committed at least eight rapes and five murders in the Bragança region in two periods: between 1953 and 1963, and between 1974 and 1975, when he was arrested. This case shocked the 1970s society in Bragança Paulista.

== Early life ==
Sebastião Antônio de Oliveira's date and place of birth is uncertain. According to a report in the newspaper Folha de S. Paulo, he was born in Tuiuti on October 7, 1915, while the magazine O Cruzeiro names the city as Ampar and the year as 1916. Since childhood, he experienced psychiatric problems that increased over the years. He married in 1938, and had several children. In the 1950s, his mental health problems got worse.

== First wave of crimes ==
In 1953, Sebastião was in Atibaia when he lured an eight-year-old boy and raped him, leaving the child almost dead. Later that year, another child was found dead with signs of rape in the Bragança region. After being denounced, he was arrested and sentenced to prison at the Carandiru Penitentiary. Psychiatric examinations requested by the court led to his transfer at the Franco da Rocha Penal Hospital for treatment. Due to his good behavior, he was transferred to the Juqueri Psychiatric Hospital in 1958. The following year, he fled Juqueri and wandered around until he settled in São Paulo. There, he lived in the Tatuapé neighborhood with his wife and daughter. On July 10, 1959, Sebastião kidnapped his daughter and fled. His wife warned the authorities, who searched São Paulo and the surrounding countryside because of De Oliveira's history. The next day, after raping her, Sebastião abandoned his daughter at the Mogi-Mirim Road in Campinas and fled again.

In 1963, he was charged with the rape of another minor and arrested in Adamantina, and was again sent to Franco da Rocha Penal Hospital. In 1969, a medical report classified him as a "pure bio-criminal with a sexopathic specialty" and Sebastião was transferred to the Taubaté Custody Hospital, where he remained until February 24, 1973, when he was released under surveillance. The following year, he roamed and begged around the Bragança Paulista region until he settled in Bragança in mid-1974.

== Second wave of crimes ==
In December 1974, Sebastião kidnapped, raped and murdered six-year-old Maria Janete (on the 26th) and eight-year-old Valdir (on the 29th), also attempting to attack four other children between those dates. The Civil Police interrogated those that escaped and received a description of the suspect. While searching for him, two more children, sisters Ana Aparecida (six) and Rosângela (seven) disappeared. With the news of their disappearance, the entire of city of Bragança started panicking, with parents preventing children from playing in the streets, going to school, etc.

After a 22-day manhunt, Sebastião was arrested in Amparo. He was driven to Bragança, where he confessed to the four murders and took the investigators to the place where he had left the bodies of the missing sisters.

== Imprisonment and death ==
The news of the arrest echoed through Bragança Paulista, so crowds began surrounding the police station in order to lynch the so-called "Monster of Bragança". The authorities had to carry out a transfer operation to Campinas, with more than 50 armed policemen escorting Sebastião to the Campinas Prison. While awaiting trial there, he received death threats from other detainees and was then transferred to Atibaia. After the court responded to a request from his defense lawyer, De Oliveira was transferred for a third time to the Franco da Rocha Penal Hospital. Subsequently, the presiding judge of the case, Dr. João Batista Lopes, asked three times in 1975 for a mental assessment to decide whether the defendant should be tried. For unknown reasons, the assessment was not carried out that year, and instead rescheduled for early 1976. On January 7, 1976, Sebastião was found hanging in his cell.

== In popular culture ==
In Bragança, the tombs of the four children located in the Saudade Municipal Cemetery became a popular pilgrimage point. Some people attribute miracles to the children and leave offerings in thanks for the graces they received.

== See also ==
- List of serial killers in Brazil
