= José Augusto do Amaral =

Brazilian serial killer

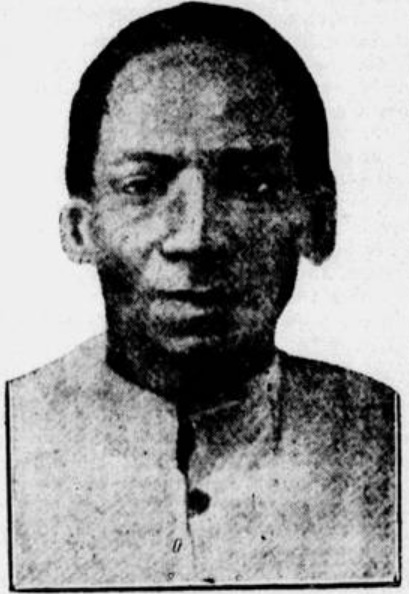
- Born: 1871; Conquista, Minas Gerais, Brazil
- Died: July 12, 1927 (aged 55–56); São Paulo, Brazil
- Other names: "Preto Amaral" "The Black Monster" "The Black Devil"
- Conviction: Never convicted
- Penalty: Died before trial

Details
- Victims: 3–8
- Span of crimes: 1926–1927
- Country: Brazil
- State: São Paulo
- Date apprehended: 1927

José Augusto do Amaral (1871 – July 12, 1927), known as Preto Amaral, is considered to be the first Brazilian serial killer.

Amaral was born in Conquista, Minas Gerais, the son of slaves from the Congo and Mozambique. When he was 17 years old, he benefitted from Princess Isabel's Lei Áurea law, which was soon to be emancipated. Soon after, without much options for work, he ended up joining the army and served in several Brazilian cities, even fighting in the War of Canudos. He disappeared several times from the battalions he served, be it in the army or police guard, and finally he was arrested, spending a few months in jail.

== Murders ==
In the year 1926, when he was 55 years old and living life as a wanderer surviving on odd jobs, he committed his first alleged crime. He was accused of strangling and sodomizing (in that order) a 27-year-old man, the body being later found in the vicinity of the Campo de Marte Airport. After that, he allegedly committed two more attacks of the same nature. Amaral had also attempted to swindle and violently attack another young man, but the victim had managed to escape because he became frightened and fled, allowing him to report the accident to the police.

== Arrest ==
Soon after he was arrested, Amaral was tortured by police and eventually confessed to the murders. Already famous in São Paulo before his arrest, the newspapers of the time told about a serial killer in the city, with the local media using the nicknames "The Black Monster" and "The Black Devil".

Amaral was examined by a psychiatrist while imprisoned, and during one of the consultations, he told the examiner about the exaggerated size of his penis, claiming that he had always had difficulties relating to women because, according to him, none of them wanted to have sex due to the size of his limb. He also said that he had gone through a macumba as a boy, and that after the ritual his penis did not stop growing. At the time this ended up relating the size of his penis to the size of his bestiality (a common thought of the population about black people at the time).

Murders continued to happen, even with Preto Amaral imprisoned, and with this he turned out to be a legend. The angry population demanded he be lynched for this crimes, but Amaral died in São Paulo from tuberculosis before his trial, five months after his 1927 arrest.

Although he was never tried, he is considered the first Brazilian serial killer, and today his story is part of São Paulo's crime museum. There even was a theatrical production titled The Crimes of Preto Amaral, which told the story of the supposed serial killer.

85 years after being accused of the crimes that shocked the city of São Paulo, a simulated jury was held in the Noble Hall of the Law School, University of São Paulo, where Preto Amaral was acquitted post-mortem by 257 votes to 57 for his conviction.

== See also ==
- List of serial killers in Brazil

== Bibliography ==
- Ilana Casoy's Serial Killers Made in Brazil (the book tells the story of those who are considered Brazilian serial killers, and it includes Preto Amaral)
