= Ronis de Oliveira Bastos =

Brazilian serial killer

- Born: 1988; Itaquaquecetuba, São Paulo, Brazil
- Died: April 24, 2017 (aged 28–29); Taubaté House of Custody and Psychiatric Treatment, Taubaté, São Paulo, Brazil
- Other name: "The Itaquaquecetuba Serial Killer"
- Conviction: N/A
- Penalty: Involuntary commitment

Details
- Victims: 8
- Span of crimes: October – December 2011
- Country: Brazil
- State: São Paulo
- Date apprehended: December 5, 2011

Ronis de Oliveira Bastos (1988 – April 24, 2017), known as the Itaquaquecetuba Serial Killer (Portuguese: Serial killer de Itaquaquecetuba), was a Brazilian serial killer who attacked ten men in the city of Itaquaquecetuba from October to December 2011, eight of which resulted in fatalities.

Before he could be brought to trial, De Oliveira was diagnosed as mentally ill and acquitted by reason of insanity, after which he was interned at the Taubaté House of Custody and Psychiatric Treatment. He remained there until his death in 2017.

== Early life ==
Little is known about Ronis de Oliveira Bastos' early life. Born in 1988 in Itaquaquecetuba, he started working as a licensed market vendor and specialized in repairing cellphones as an adult. Prior to the murders, he was described as an average young man who had no criminal record and showed no violent tendencies. He initially lived together with his mother, who eventually had to flee to the southern parts of the country after her son was accused of committing the murders. It was later revealed that she knew he was responsible, but did not report him to the police out of fear that he would retaliate.

== Murders ==
Between October and December 2011, ten men were attacked in the Jardim Luciana neighborhood of Greater São Paulo, eight of whom died. Witnesses described the perpetrator as a young white man of short stature who rode around the streets on a blue bicycle and was wearing a ninja hood. All the victims were random men aged between 20 and 50, most of them shot (with the exception of the second victim, who was stabbed) with either a .38 caliber revolver or shotgun. Per Brazilian law, their names were not released, as De Oliveira would later be ruled incapable of standing trial.

The head investigator Eduardo Boigues noted that the killer was cold and intentionally wanted to show that one man was responsible for all crimes, as he always left an unused shell at the crime scenes as a sort of "calling card". After De Oliveira's arrest, it was revealed that he went straight home after each murder, and on one occasion had even joined a protest calling for the capture of the serial killer.

=== Investigation and capture ===
With the help of witnesses, a physical profile and facial composite of the criminal was created, and police officers were dispatched to the Jardim Luciana neighborhood. Despite these measures, there were three more shootings that occurred the following weekend. Two of these victims, and the sole survivor, Jefferson Soares da Silva, managed to survive. After recovering, he identified the shooter as 22-year-old Ronis de Oliveira Bastos.

On December 5, De Oliveira was spotted riding a blue bicycle and carrying a .38 caliber revolver, but when questioned, he claimed it was for his own protection. This claim was not believed and he was immediately arrested for possession of illegal weaponry, with a subsequent search of his home leading to the location of shell casings identical to those found at the crime scenes, as well as the ninja hood and a backpack in which De Oliveira hid his guns.

== Internment and death ==
Before he could be put to trial, De Oliveira was transferred to the São Paulo Institute of Social Medicine and Criminology for a psychiatric evaluation. There, it was ruled that he suffered from serious mental disorders and was thus incapable of standing trial. As a result, he was acquitted by reason of insanity and committed to the Taubaté House of Custody and Psychiatric Treatment. He remained there until his death on April 24, 2017, but the exact cause of death is unknown.

== See also ==
- List of serial killers in Brazil
