= Paturis Park murders =

2007–08 unsolved murders of gay men in Brazil

Rainbow Maniac

Details
- Victims: 13
- Span of crimes: 2007–2008
- Country: Brazil
- State: São Paulo
- Target: Gay men
- Weapon: Firearm
- Date apprehended: N/A

The Paturis Park murders are a series of 13 murders of gay men committed between July 2007 and August 2008. The murders took place in Paturis Park ("Parque dos Paturis") in Carapicuíba, Brazil, and were perpetrated by an unidentified serial killer who has been dubbed the "Rainbow Maniac".

== Murders and investigation ==
The killings took place between February 2007 and August 2008 in Paturis Park. The victims, all gay men, were aged 20–40. All but one were shot, 12 of them in the head; one died from blows to the head. The last victim was shot 12 times. According to Brazilian media, the park is in an area frequented by prostitutes. Police dubbed the killer the "Rainbow Maniac", a reference to the gay pride flag.

The first murder occurred on 4 July 2007 and the last on 15 March 2009.

Officials from the São Paulo State Public Safety Department announced that the killer could be a state police officer. As of 2008, tests are underway to see if the same gun was used in each murder.

== Suspect arrested and released ==
On 10 December 2008, police arrested a retired state police sergeant, Jairo Francisco Franco, based on witness statements implicating him in a murder which occurred on 19 August 2008. A witness claims to have seen Franco shoot a black gay man 12 times that night. Another witness told police that Franco often visited the park to look for gay men and victims.

On 23 August 2011, Jairo Francisco Franco was released after the trial, having been declared not guilty by the jury by 4 votes against 2.

== See also ==
- List of fugitives from justice who disappeared
- List of unsolved murders (2000–present)
- List of serial killers in Brazil
