= José Vicente Matias =

Brazilian serial killer

- Born: September 24, 1966 (age 60); Firminópolis, Goiás, Brazil
- Other name: "Corumbá"
- Conviction: Murder
- Penalty: 23 years imprisonment

Details
- Victims: 6
- Span of crimes: 1999–2005
- Country: Brazil
- States: Minas Gerais, Bahia, Goiás, Maranhão
- Date apprehended: March 29, 2005

José Vicente Matias (born September 24, 1966), also known as Corumbá, is a Brazilian serial killer and former artisan who raped, murdered and then dismembered 6 girls and women between 1999 and 2005. In addition to killing, Matias also practised cannibalism with the remains of his victims, ingesting blood and brain pieces from them.

In his testimonies, 'Corumbá' gave contradictory statements on several occasions. He sometimes mentioned suffering "influences" from the Devil, who whispered in his ear that his mission was to kill seven women, while on other occasions, he cited xenophobia and jokes aimed at his sexual impotence. Before this, he had been arrested by the police for rape and violent assault. He was sentenced to 23 years imprisonment on June 2, 2008.

== Victims ==
- Natália Canhas Carneiro - the 15-year-old Minas Gerais native was killed in September 1999 in the municipality of Três Marias.
- Simone Lima Pinho - the 26-year-old hippie and fellow artisan from Bahia was beaten and stoned to death in June 2000 in the municipality of Lençóis.
- Lidiane Vieira de Melo - the 16-year-old from Goiana spent a day and a half bound while Matias drank her blood. After her death, she had her body dismembered. She was killed in Goiânia, in January 2004.
- Katryn Rakitov - 29-year-old Russian-Israeli who was killed in Pirenópolis, Goiás.
- Maryanne Kern - the 49-year-old German tourist was found in a shallow grave in Barreirinhas municipality, in Maranhão.
- Núria Fernandez Collada - the 27-year-old Spanish tourist was killed with blows to the head, and had parts of her brain and blood ingested after Matias performed a dance ritual. She was killed on the beach of Itatinga in Alcântara, Maranhão.

== See also ==
- List of serial killers in Brazil
