= Alagoa Nova =

- Municipality
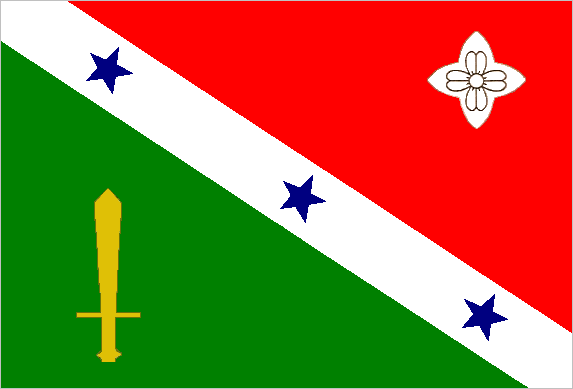
- Flag Coat of arms

- Location in Brazil
- Coordinates: 7.07083°S 35.7578°W
- Country: Brazil
- Region: Northeast
- State: Paraíba
- Mesoregion: Agreste Paraibano

Population (2020)
  - Total: 20,921
- Time zone: UTC−3 (BRT)

Alagoa Nova (Central northeastern portuguese pronunciation: [ɐlɐˈɡoɐ ˈnɔvɐ]) is a municipality in the state of Paraíba in the Northeast Region of Brazil.

== See also ==
- List of municipalities in Paraíba
