= Taubaté Prison =

Brazilian prison

Coordinates: 23.013°S 45.549°W

Casa de Custódia de Taubaté
- Interactive map of Casa de Custódia de Taubaté
- Location: Taubaté, São Paulo state, Brazil
- Director: Brazilian police

Taubaté Prison is a correctional facility in the city of Taubaté, São Paulo state, Brazil. The facility has the distinction of being the birthplace of the gang Primeiro Comando da Capital.

== Background ==
Taubaté Prison is located 135km (85 miles) north of São Paulo.

In August 1993, the Primeiro Comando da Capital or PCC, was formed at Taubaté Prison, under jail conditions that have been described as a "a Hobbesian nightmare". The gang would begin to expand their operations significantly beyond prison walls, becoming a serious organized crime threat in Brazil.

The chaotic nature of the conditions inside the Brazilian prison system, including Taubaté, have made the facility a breeding ground for gang violence and rioting.

On December 19, 2000, more than 220 prisoners rioted at the facility in a 30 hour standoff. Inmates held more than 20 hostages. Nine prisoners would die in the melee.
