= Benedito Moreira de Carvalho =

Brazilian serial killer and rapist (1910–1976)

- Press photograph by Dario Terini (1952)
- Born: August 10, 1909; Tambaú, São Paulo, Brazil
- Died: October 8, 1977 (aged 68); Franco da Rocha Psychiatric Hospital, Franco da Rocha, São Paulo, Brazil
- Other names: "The Monster of Guianases" "The Monster of Guaiauna" "The Blonde Strangler" "The Blonde Monster"
- Convictions: Sexual assault on a minor Sexual assault
- Penalty: Various (sex crimes); Acquittal by reason of insanity (murders)

Details
- Victims: 11 homicides (18 rapes)
- Span of crimes: February 26 – August 21, 1952
- Country: Brazil
- State: São Paulo
- Date apprehended: For the final time on August 29, 1952

Benedito Moreira de Carvalho (August 10, 1909 – October 8, 1977), known as The Monster of Guaianases (Portuguese: Monstro de Guaianases), was a Brazilian serial killer and child rapist who killed eleven girls in Greater São Paulo from 1937 to 1952. Ruled unfit to stand trial, he was imprisoned in a psychiatric hospital until his death in 1977.

== Early life ==
Benedito Moreira de Carvalho was born on August 10, 1910, in Tambaú. His mother died at childbirth, due to which he and his eleven other brothers had to be raised by their father. Moreira would later claim that his father punished him for the smallest infractions so harshly that he got dizzy.

In his youth, he joined the Military Police of São Paulo State where he served nine years as a nurse in the Fire Department, but was eventually expelled for committing a sexual offence. From then on, Moreira worked in various professions, including as a carpenter, bricklayer's assistant and mechanic's assistant, always in short periods.

He married Marina Reis de Almeida in 1930, with whom he had a son and daughter. Neighbors considered Moreira a good husband and an educated, respectful man who would make interesting conversations. Unbeknownst to most, however, Moreira's sexual disorders grew so persistent that he sought medical treatment. Unable to afford the high cost of hospitalization (approximately 3,600 cruzeiros), he sought the help of traditional healers who recommended him teas to control his impulses. He would later claim that they had no effect, and since he could not satisfy his desires with his wife as she suffered from an illness, he went out searching for strangers.

== Sexual assaults ==
Very little is known about Moreira's early crimes, but they are believed to have been committed in 1937, 1941, 1946, 1951 and 1952, according to report from a board of psychiatrists who examined him at the Franco da Rocha Psychiatric Hospital. The very first of these was the molestation of a minor, for which he was imprisoned for a year in jail.

In 1951, while awaiting trial on charges of seducing a minor, Moreira managed to escape a jail in Mogi das Cruzes and fled to Itaquera, where he attempted to accost several women. He was caught attempting to molest Japanese national Dioneko Tanagushi, and later returned to the hospital.

== Murders ==
After being released the following year, Moreira moved a house in São Paulo's Guaiaúna neighborhood. Shortly afterwards, he resumed his sexual attacks, but this time started killing his victims.

His modus operandi consisted of moving between various neighborhoods and nearby cities, where he attacked victims on isolated roads and streets in sparsely populated areas. At the time, Greater São Paulo's low population density and abundance of scrubland and farms allowed for many potential hiding places for the criminal. Moreira's victim profile predominantly consisted of unaccompanied children, adolescents or young adults, most of whom were of Japanese descent. He approached them directly and offered to have sex, and if they attempted to run away, he would catch up with them and quickly overpower them. Moreira would strangle them (either manually or with a small rope he carried with him) into unconsciousness and then drag them off to the nearby woods to have sex with them. As he apparently did not care whether his victims were alive or dead during the rape, some have suggested that he might have been a necrophile.

== Victims ==
Name	Age	Date	Place	Notes
Lidia Lisboa da Silva	43	January 1952	São Paulo	Attacked on Poá Road and got into a physical fight, but managed to escape. She recognized her assailant after his arrest via photographs released in the press.
Teresa Panza	14	February 26, 1952	Diadema	
Gertrude Dunzinger	29	April 7, 1952	Parelheiros	Murdered en route to her home after getting off a bus. Dunzinger, a mother of three, was an Austrian national who did not speak Portuguese.
Namiko Suetnu	12	May 26, 1952	Fazenda da Juta or Estrada do Sapopemba	
Maria de Lourdes da Silva	19	unknown	Guarulhos	She later served as a key witness in Moreira's identification as a suspect.
Luisa Marlene dos Santos	11	June 18, 1952	Itaquaquecetuba	
Marina da Silva	unknown	June 20, 1952	Barueri	
Marcilia Oliveira de Souza	18	July 21, 1952	Parada XV de Novembro, São Paulo	
Maria Nishigawa	11	August 2, 1952	São Bernardo do Campo	Double attack. "JPT" survived, but Nishigawa did not.
"JPT"	8	August 2, 1952	São Bernardo do Campo	Double attack. "JPT" survived, but Nishigawa did not. Moreira's only known male victim.
Mioko Okuyama	14	August 21, 1952	Guarulhos	

== Investigation, arrest, and detention ==
Due to the increasing number of attacks and murders in the region, a team of investigators was formed to catch the perpetrator. While interviewing one of the surviving victims and some witnesses, investigators were puzzled when some of them said that he was very similar to one of their investigators, Adalberto Kurt. From there, the team combed through the police records for sexual offenders that resembled Kurt, eventually locating Moreira's profile.

Looking further into him, investigators learned that he worked at various sawmills around the city as a temporary worker and had absences coinciding with the dates of certain crimes. Since he had given a fake address to his employers, the authorities tracked down his actual address and installed a bell to alarm them when he would return. On August 29, Moreira was apprehended without incident.

An inspection of his home revealed a list containing the numbers and locations relating to the attacks, in addition to stolen school bags (one of which had the small rope) and newspaper clippings about the crimes. The arrest caused a stir in the city due to the unusually high number of victims for the era. Due to this, the police reinvestigated similar cases from the past that resulted in the exoneration of several men serving prison sentences for attacks that were confirmed to be Moreira's doing.

In the immediate aftermath of his arrest, Moreira admitted responsibility for attacks involving children, but claimed that he was not interested in adult women and was not involved in the attack on Lidia da Silva. Not long after his arrest, Moreira underwent a psychiatric evaluation that determined he was incapable of standing trial due to his mental abnormalities. Because of this, he was interned at the Franco da Rocha Psychiatric Hospital, where he remained until his death in 1977.

== See also ==
- List of serial killers in Brazil
- Incidents of necrophilia
