= Francisco de Marco =

Brazilian serial child killer

- Born: 1922; Brazil
- Died: after October 31, 1984
- Other names: "The Monster of Rio Claro" "The Vampire of Rio Claro" "The Glazier Man"; Darci Nogueira
- Conviction: Murder x7
- Penalty: 20 years (1953); 30 years (1961); 70 years (1984)

Details
- Victims: 7+
- Span of crimes: 1953–1984
- Country: Brazil
- States: São Paulo, Minas Gerais
- Date apprehended: For the final time in June 1984

Francisco de Marco (1922 – after October 31, 1984), known as The Monster of Rio Claro (Portuguese: Monstro de Rio Claro), was a Brazilian serial killer and pedophile who killed a total of seven children in the states of São Paulo and Minas Gerais from 1953 to 1984, most of them committed after being released or escaping from prison. For the final crime, he was sentenced to 70 years imprisonment, but his date of death is unclear.

== Early life and first murder ==
Little is known about Francisco de Marco's background. Born in 1922, he was convicted for unspecified sexual crimes as an adult, for which he served three years imprisonment. Released either during the late 1940s or early 1950s, he settled in Marília, where he married and had three children. According to neighbors, none of whom were aware of his previous convictions, he was considered a humble and peaceful man who made an honest living as a glazier.

De Marco's first recorded murder occurred on March 1, 1953, when he lured 7-year-old Iracema Rubino dos Santos, the daughter of a neighbor, to a cornfield under the guise of helping him with the harvest. He then proceeded to rape and asphyxiate the girl before dumping her body at a farm behind the town stadium. He was quickly arrested and sentenced to 20 years imprisonment for this crime, which he served at the Marília Public Jail. A model inmate, de Marco used his prison privileges to escape confinement after serving three years of his sentence.

== Later murders ==
By 1961, de Marco had moved to the municipality of Ponte Nova in Minas Gerais and worked under the alias 'Darci Nogueira', where he would commit two additional murders. The first was an unidentified 14-year-old girl, whom he shot with a garrucha in unclear circumstances. This crime was witnessed by a young boy, Antonio Carlos Fernandes, whom de Marco threatened to kill. A week later, Fernandes was tracked down, raped, shot twice in the head and had his body set on fire. De Marco then fled to Guaxupé, where he soon apprehended by authorities.

For these murders, de Marco was sentenced to an additional 30 years imprisonment, which he served in several prisons across São Paulo. By early 1981, when he incarcerated at the Carandiru Penitentiary, he was granted parole under the conditions that he be supervised by family members.

De Marco then settled in Rio Claro, where he lived with some family members as required. Unbeknownst to the authorities, he began searching for victims yet again, luring them with offers of sweets and candies to an abandoned farmhouse, ostensibly to pick fruits. When they were alone, he would proceed to sexually violate and asphyxiate his victims, emasculating them if they were male.

On October 22, 1982, de Marco killed and emasculated 11-year-old shoeshiner Alberto Antônio Antonelli and then dumped his body at the Edmundo Navarro de Andrade State Forest. From the remainder of 1982 until early 1984, he killed three additional victims in this way (9-year-old José Nogueira Neto; 9-year-old Maria Márcia de Lima Carvalho and 11-year-old Moacir de Silva), leaving their bodies in sugarcane fields.

== Arrest and trial ==
By May 1984, the murders received national attention, leading officers from Marília to compare them with the de Marco's first killing in 1953. After numerous similarities were found, a warrant was issued for his arrest and he was subsequently captured without incident the following month.

An inspection of his home led to the discovery of a shoeshine brush used by Antonelli, as well as PVC pipes that were identical to the ones used to sodomize the boys and were later discarded next to the bodies. When queried for his motivations, de Marco simply stated that he "sometimes lost [his] mind" and went looking for children.

His trial was held on October 31, 1984, and resulted in a 70-year prison sentence. What happened to him afterwards is unknown, but it is presumed that he is now deceased.

== See also ==
- List of serial killers in Brazil
