= Parque Trianon =

Park in São Paulo, Brazil

Coordinates: 23.5622°S 46.6572°W

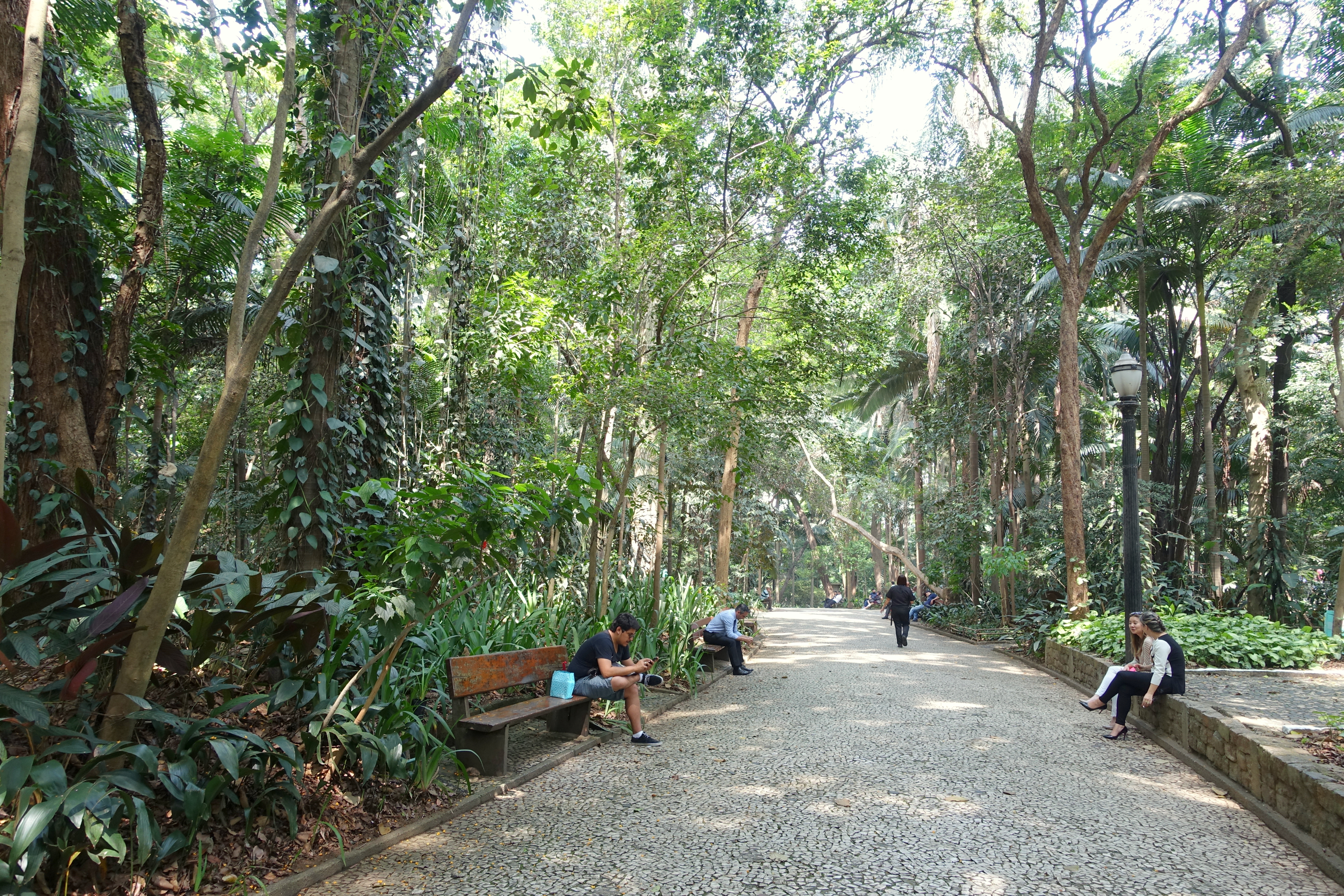
Trianon Park

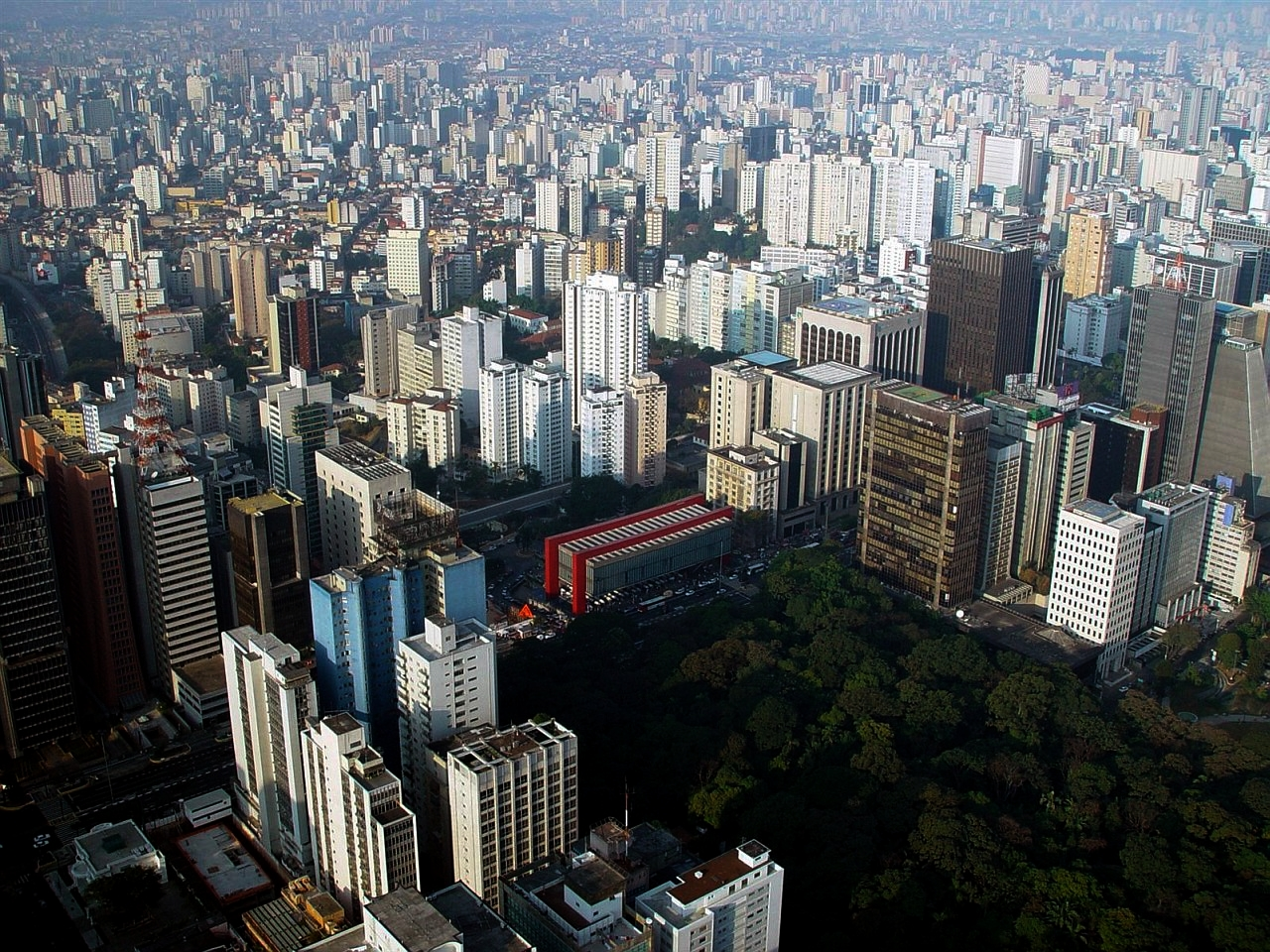
Trianon from above

Parque Trianon (officially Parque Tenente Siqueira Campos) is a park located on Paulista Avenue in São Paulo, Brazil.
