= Francisco de Assis Pereira =

Brazilian serial killer

- Born: Francisco de Assis Pereira; November 29, 1967 (age 58); São Paulo, São José do Rio Preto
- Other names: The Park Maniac; Chico Estrela
- Years active: 1998
- Convictions: Murder; Rape; Concealment of death Violent indecent assault
- Penalty: 268 years imprisonment

Details
- Victims: 11
- Span of crimes: 1997–1998
- Country: Brazil
- State: São Paulo
- Date apprehended: August 4, 1998

Francisco de Assis Pereira (born November 29, 1967), also known as "O Maníaco do Parque" ("The Park Maniac"), is a Brazilian serial killer. He was arrested in 1998 for the rape and murder of 11 women and for assaulting nine others in a São Paulo park.

== Early life ==
Francisco de Assis Pereira was born on November 29, 1967, in São Paulo. As a child he was molested by his aunt, after which he developed a fixation on breasts. As an adult, he was seduced by his boss to engage in homosexual relationships. In one such relationship, a goth man almost ripped off Pereira's penis, making him fear losing his reproductive organs.

Pereira showed a darker side even before the murders. Thayna, a travesti with whom he lived for more than a year, reported that Francisco had punched her in the stomach and slapped in the face, just as some of the survivors of his later attacks had claimed. Because of the incident with the goth man, he felt pain during sexual acts, and the impossibility of pleasure is suspected to be the reason for Pereira's murder spree.

== Investigation ==
Prior to the investigation of the murders, Pereira had already been summoned to testify with the DHPP to clarify the use of a check sheet in the name of Isadora Fraenkel, which he had used to purchase a helmet; having alleged the use of the check with Fraenkel's consent (she was not his girlfriend, but rather a randomly chosen victim), he was released soon after. At the time of the murders, Pereira worked as a motorcycle courier at a company near the police station that investigated the crimes. The owner at the time reported the employee's strange attitude days before the DHPP's visit, and that he had left a note reporting of his sudden resignation and departure from the company. The day before the murderer slipped up when he approached a girl whilst having a psychotic episode and she responded by saying she was not able to accompany him at that moment. The killer then reportedly gave her a business with the name 'Jean' which also contained the name and phone number of the company he worked for so she could reach him when she was available. This girl reported the incident to the DHPP, who immediately contacted the phone number on the card and reached the courier company which they had already previously investigated. On the other side of the call the owner then informed the police of Pereira's departure, leaving only the newspaper that showed the murderer's sketch, as well as a farewell message.

Pereira was extroverted and convincing, and left the victims to describe their present situation, usually of conflict in their relationships, and then use this information to conquer and convince the girls to go with him. He acted mainly around subway stations, more frequently in the lines connected to the station of Jabaquara, where he approached his victims with the promise of participation in photo shoots of a large cosmetics company, usually focusing on women with apparent emotional discomfort, which the delinquent described as "sad" and "head low," with apparent susceptibility to approaching strangers.

When he disappeared, he only left a newspaper and a note on the table. He regretted having to leave, apologizing for the sudden action:

"My journey here, has ended..."

Pereira found his victims by posing as a talent scout for a modeling agency. He would often use shoelaces to strangle his victims after raping them. Pereira worked as a motorcycle courier during the course of the crimes. Pereira was arrested on August 4, 1998, in Itaqui, Rio Grande do Sul, ending a 23-day manhunt when he was reported to police after fisherman João Carlos Villaverde, who he was staying with, saw his picture on television. He also indicated the location of Selma's bones, which had not yet been found by the police in the State Park. After being captured by the police, what most impressed the authorities was how an unarmed man could convince the women to climb the rump of a motorcycle and go into the middle of a thicket with a man they had just met. Today the killer is a record holder receiving letters at the prison, the convict even married an admirer, having separated later times with reports of the ex-bride, of strangeness in his actions and personality. Pereira will be released in 2028 after completing the maximum 30 years of seclusion required by Brazilian law, and noted psychiatrists indicate the certainty that he will commit another offense due to his pseudo psychopathic, irreversible state of mind.

== Murders ==
=== Elisângela Francisco da Silva ===
Elisângela Francisco da Silva was a 21-year-old from Paraná, coming from a poor Londrina family, who had been living with her aunt Solange Barbosa in São Paulo since 1996. Due to financial difficulties, she left school in the 7th grade. After being left by a friend at the Eldorado Mall in the West Zone of São Paulo, she was never seen again. Her naked body was found on July 28 in the State Park. The already decomposed body required hard work so it could be identified, and she was identified only three days later. "I hoped it was not her.", her aunt said. On the day of her disappearance, Silva left home saying that she would return in two hours.

=== Raquel Mota Rodrigues ===
The great ambition of 23-year-old Raquel Mota Rodrigues was to earn money to help her family, who lived in Gravataí, Rio Grande do Sul. On weekends, she went out to bars with three friends, never going after midnight. Around 8 o'clock on the night of January 9, she left the furniture store where she worked as a saleswoman, in the Pinheiros neighborhood. Upon arriving at the Jabaquara station, almost at home, she called her cousin Lígia, saying that she had met a young man and accepted his offer of posing as a model for him in Diadema, São Paulo. Her cousin warned her not go, saying it was too risky to go out with a stranger. Rodrigues replied that she would not go, but never returned home. Her body was found in the thicket of the State Forest on January 16.

=== Selma Ferreira Queiroz ===
Queiroz was a minor and the youngest of three sisters, intending to study accounting or computer science. Her plans, however, were cut short in the afternoon of July 3. She disappeared in the area between her house in Cotia and Downtown São Paulo, where she would deal with the formalities related to her dismissal as a drugstore clerk. The next day a man called Sara, her sister, claiming that the girl had been kidnapped and asked for a ransom of 1,000 reais. He said that he would call back later that afternoon, but he did not. That same day, Queiroz's body was found in the State Park. She was naked, with signs of rape and beating. Bite marks were also found on shoulders, breasts and legs. Queiroz had been strangled, shortly after she had informed her boyfriend that she would not be able to come in time to watch the 1998 FIFA World Cup with him, but was on the way to his residence.

=== Patrícia Gonçalves Marinho ===
At the age of 24, Marinho had never revealed to her family that she had dreamed of being a model. On April 17, after leaving the house of her grandmother Josefa, with whom she lived, the girl disappeared. Her body was discovered on July 28, in a deserted area of the State Park. Identification of the body was only possible thanks to the clothes and jewelry found next to the body. She was raped and then strangled to death.

== Letters ==
Pereira received several letters from admirers in jail.

Journalist and writer Gilmar Rodrigues published in 2009 the book "Loucas de Amor - women who love serial killers and sexual criminals" (Editorial "Ideas a Bulk"), where he tried to understand why the maniac was wanted by so many women. He was impressed by the one thousand letters of love the felon received a month after he was arrested in 1998.

== Sentence and aftermath ==
He was eventually sentenced to a total of 268 years in prison. Pereira would go on to say, "I was possessed by an evil force." and "I am a person with a good and a bad personality. Sometimes I am not able to dominate this dark side. I pray, I pray, but I cannot resist and then I chase after women. I wished that they would not go with me into the park, that they would run away." After being caught he claimed he was about to start cannibalizing his victims.

On December 18, 2000, inmates tried to kill Pereira during a riot at the Taubaté House of Custody and Psychiatric Treatment and four inmates were killed. Pereira was then moved to another psychiatric facility. He had said that he considers himself a "normal person", and that, according to him, he is alive because of his faith. Pereira also claimed that what he had done in the past would not have been a result of his own will, but of an "evil thing, damn it." He met his current wife Jussara through letters while imprisoned, with her trying to solve his legal problems. "She is intelligent, has a great background and a degree in History and Geography", he boasted.

An Ibope survey for the Public Prosecutor's Office in 2004 showed that this case is most remembered by Brazilians, with a 76% index, the most remembered police case between 2006 and 2007.

Francisco de Assis Pereira was portrayed by Silvero Pereira in the 2024 feature film Maníaco do Parque.

== See also ==
- List of serial killers in Brazil
- List of serial killers by number of victims

== Bibliography ==
- Luisa Alcalde and Luis Carlos dos Santos: "Hunt for the Park Maniac". São Paulo. Editora Escritura, 2000.
