= List of German serial killers =

A serial killer is typically a person who murders three or more people, with the murders taking place over more than a month and including a significant period of time between them. The Federal Bureau of Investigation (FBI) defines serial killing as "a series of two or more murders, committed as separate events, usually, but not always, by one offender acting alone".

== Before 1900 ==
Name	Years active	Victims	Status	Notes
Bingelhelm, Simon	16th-century	26	Executed 1600	Known as "The Thousand Devils of Halberstadt"; robber who confessed to multiple murders in the present-day area of Saxony-Anhalt.
Fleischer, Simeon	16th-century	19	Executed 1581	Wool weaver who murdered 19 wives for money; existence is disputed.
Genipperteinga, Christman	1568–1581	964	Executed 1581	Possibly fictitious bandit who kept a registry of all the people he had killed, tallying up to 964.
Gottfried, Gesche	1813–1827	15	Executed 1831	Poisoned people with arsenic in Bremen and Hanover; last person to be publicly beheaded in Bremen.
Hanebuth, Jasper	17th-century	19	Executed 1653	Former mercenary and highwayman who killed people around the Eilenriede forest.
Niers, Peter	16th-century	544+	Executed 1581	Reputed bandit and gang leader who killed numerous people with his accomplices
Stumpp, Peter	c. 1564–1589	18	Executed 1589	Known as "The Werewolf of Bedburg"; farmer and accused cannibal who killed people in the 16th-century.
Ursinus, Sophie	1796–1803	3	Died 1836	Poisoned her family members with arsenic; her trial led to a method of identifying said type of poisoning.
Wittmann, Ferdinand	1860–1865	6	Executed 1868	Poisoned his relatives with arsenic.
Zwanziger, Anna Maria	1801–1811	4	Executed 1811	Bavarian poisoner who killed people with arsenic; executed by decapitation in Kulmbach.

== 1900 to 1945 ==
Name	Years active	Victims	Status	Notes
Denke, Karl	1903–1924	30 (possibly 42+)	Committed suicide in police custody	Cannibal who killed homeless vagrants and travellers in Prussia; allegedly sold his victims' flesh as meat to unsuspecting customers.
Eichhorn, Johann	1931–1939	5 (possibly 5+)	Executed 1939	Known as "The Beast of Aubing"; raped numerous women around western Munich, killing and mutilating at least five of them when they resisted him.
Großmann, Carl	1918–1921	26 (possibly 100+)	Committed suicide while imprisoned	Known as "The Berlin Butcher"; killed women and later sold their flesh on the black market.
Haarmann, Fritz	1918–1924	24 (possibly 27+)	Executed 1925	Known as "The Butcher of Hanover"; murdered young men and boys before dismembering their bodies; allegedly sold some of the flesh as contraband meat.
Hopf, Karl	1902–1906	4	Executed 1914	Poisoned family members and attempted to kill others in the Frankfurt area.
Kürten, Peter	1913–1929	9 (possibly 9+)	Executed 1931	Known as "The Vampire of Düsseldorf"; responsible for numerous sexual assaults, murders and attempted murders.
Mayer, Johann	1918–1919	5	Executed 1923	Known as "Stumpfarm"; disabled man who shot and killed people with a carbine.
Ogorzow, Paul	1940–1941	8 (possibly 8+)	Executed 1941	Known as "The S-Bahn Murderer"; SA sergeant who killed women in wartime Berlin.
Schumann, Friedrich	1909–1920	9 (possibly 25)	Executed 1921	Known as "The Terror of Falkenhagen Lake"; criminal who killed people in the Berlin area.
Seefeldt, Adolf	1908–1935	12 (possibly 12+)	Executed 1936	Known as "The Sandman"; travelling watchmaker who poisoned and then sexually assaulted young boys in their sleep.
Sternickel, August	1905–1913	7	Executed 1913	Petty criminal who killed his employer in 1905; while on the run for authorities in the next years, proceeded to kill other people for profit.
Tessnow, Ludwig	1898–1901	4	Executed 1904	First criminal in history on whom a blood type test was performed.
Wiese, Elisabeth	1902–1903	5	Executed 1905	Known as "The Angel Maker of St. Pauli"; poisoned her grandchild and other children with morphine, burning their bodies in the stove afterwards.
Zimmermann, Rudolf	1940	4	Executed 1940	Itinerant labourer who raped and murdered young girls across Germany and Czechoslovakia.

== 1945 to 1989 ==
Name	Years active	Proven victims	Possible victims	Status	Notes	Ref
Bartsch, Jürgen	1962–1966	4	4	Died during castration surgery	Known as "The Carnival Killer"; killed boys aged 8–13 in Langenberg, with one managing to escape	
Beck, Ernst-Dieter	1961–1968	3	3	Died while imprisoned	First murderer in German history on whom a chromosome test was applied	
Gosmann, Klaus	1960–1965	7	7	Released 2015	Known as "The Midday Murderer"; committed robberies and murders at noon, hence his nickname	
Hagedorn, Erwin	1969–1971	3	3	Executed 1972	Killed three boys in Eberswalde; last civilian to be executed for ordinary crimes in East Germany	
Holst, Thomas	1987–1989	3	3	Committed to a psychiatric clinic	Known as "The Heidemörder"; tortured and then killed women in south Hamburg	
Honka, Fritz	1970–1975	4	4	Died 1998	Murdered prostitutes in Hamburg's red light district	
Hößl, Peter	1959–1982	4	6	Died in prison	Shot and killed strangers in the Munich district for sexual gratification	
Imiela, Arwed	1968–1969	4	4	Died in prison	Known as "The Bluebeard of Fehmarn"; fraudster who lured and killed women in Fehmarn after gaining access to their bank accounts	
Kimmritz, Willi	1946–1948	4	4	Executed 1950	Known as "The Horror of the Brandenburg Forest"; raped and robbed women in the forests around Berlin, killing some of his victims	
Kroll, Joachim	1955–1976	14	14	Died while imprisoned	Known as "The Ruhr Cannibal"; raped and killed mostly women in and around the Ruhr region, eating parts of their flesh afterwards	
Lehmann, Christa	1952–1954	3	3	Released 1977	Poisoned family members and the family dog; initially sentenced to life imprisonment but released after 23 years	
Ludy, Franz Josef	1952–1968	4	4	Sentenced to life imprisonment	Serial child abuser who murdered two children and a couple	
Pinzner, Werner	1984–1986	13	13	Committed suicide to avoid apprehension	Known as "The St. Pauli Killer"; contract killer who murdered various people around Hamburg	
Pleil, Rudolf	1946–1947	10	25	Committed suicide while imprisoned	Known as "The Deadmaker"; killed one salesman and nine women in the Harz mountain range, but confessed to killing more	
Poehlke, Norbert	1984–1985	6	6	Committed suicide to avoid apprehension	Known as "The Hammer-Killer"; police officer and bank robber who killed people during his crimes in Baden-Württemberg; killed his wife, two sons and then himself in Italy to avoid capture	
Pommerenke, Heinrich	1959	4	4+	Died while imprisoned	Killed women around Baden-Württemberg; longest-serving prisoner in Germany until his death	
Prigan, Bernhard	1947–1952	3	16	Sentenced to life imprisonment	Known as "The Strangler"; killed women near controlled-access highways and major roads	
Schiffer, Egidius	1983–1990	5	5	Died in prison	Known as "The Strangler of Aachen"; murdered girls and women, sexually abusing three of them	
Schmidt, Ulrich	1987–1989	5	5	Sentenced to life imprisonment	Known as "The Holiday Killer"; Assaulted nine women in Essen, killing five.	
Steinwegs, Kurt-Friedhelm	1974–1983	6	6	Committed to a psychiatric institution	Known as "The Monster from Lower Rhine"; juvenile delinquent who killed six people	
Stiebitz, Mario	1983–1984	5	5	Sentenced to life imprisonment	Sadist who murdered a young man and four children around Neubrandenburg and the surrounding area	
Swinka, Irmgard	1947–1948	5	5+	Died a year after release from prison	Together with two male accomplices, poisoned and robbed elderly women across Allied-occupied Germany; last person to be sentenced to death by a West German court outside of West Berlin	
Velten, Maria	1963–1982	3	5	Died 2008	Known as "The Poison Witch from Lower Rhine"; poisoned her family members and partners with parathion; released from prison at 93	
Wichmann, Kurt-Werner	1989	4	21+	Committed suicide	Cemetery gardener thought to be responsible for the Göhrde Murders, and other ones as well	
Wittmann, Manfred	1968–1969	3	3	Released 2013	Known as "The Staffelstein Killer"; sadist who killed underage girls in Coburg	

== Post-reunification ==
Name	Years active	Proven victims	Possible victims	Status	Notes	Ref
Becker, Irene	2005–2006	5	8	Sentenced to life imprisonment	Known as "The Angel of Death from Charité"	
Bodenfelde Black Widows	1983–2000	4	4	Sentenced to life imprisonment / 12 years for accomplice	Lydia L. killed four older men with the help of Siggi S. in Bodenfelde.	
Böhnhardt, Uwe	2000–2007	10	10	Killed by partner	Neo-Nazi who killed immigrants throughout Germany, with accomplices Beate Zschäpe and Uwe Mundlos	
David, Horst	1975–1993	3	7+	Died in prison	One of his murders proved to be a milestone in German criminal history, as it was the first 20-year-old crime to be solved with the help of the computer-assisted tracking system of AFIS	
Eckert, Volker	1974–2006	6	14+	Committed suicide in police custody	Trucker who abducted, tortured and killed prostitutes in Germany, Spain and France; confessed to additional murders, including ones in Italy and the Czech Republic	
Gatter, Arthur	1990	8	8	Committed suicide before sentencing	Known as "The Hammer-Killer of Frankfurt"; killed people with a hammer in Frankfurt city parks	
Gust, Frank	1994–1998	4	4	Sentenced to life imprisonment	Known as "The Rhine-Ruhr-Ripper"; sexual sadist who killed and subsequently mutilated women in the Rhine-Ruhr region	
Högel, Niels	2000–2005	106	300	Sentenced to life imprisonment	Male nurse who killed patients in two hospitals in Oldenburg and Delmenhorst	
Lemke, Thomas	1995–1996	3	3	Sentenced to life imprisonment	Former mercenary and far-right extremist who killed political opponents	
Letter, Stephan	2003–2004	29	29+	Sentenced to life imprisonment	Male nurse who poisoned patients in Sonthofen	
Metzler, Marco	2003–2006	3	3	Sentenced to life imprisonment	Truck driver who attacked and killed women along highways	
Mundlos, Uwe	2000–2007	11	11	Committed suicide to avoid apprehension	Neo-Nazi who killed immigrants throughout Germany, with accomplices Beate Zschäpe and Uwe Böhnhardt	
Ney, Martin	1992–2004	3	4	Sentenced to life imprisonment	Known as "The Masked Man"; prolific pedophile who murdered children in school camps; additionally suspected of killing French boy Jonathan Coulom	
Nölle, Marianne	1993	7	17	Sentenced to life imprisonment	Nurse who killed patients in Cologne	
P. Dirk	2012	3	5	Sentenced to life imprisonment. Committed suicide in prison.	Poisoned men he dated in the Berlin gay dance scene. Possibly killed family members before.	
Rung, Thomas	1983–1995	7	7	Sentenced to life imprisonment	Raped and murdered six women in Berlin, as well as his stepbrother; another man falsely confessed to his first murder	
S., Tuba	2016	3	3+	Sentenced to life imprisonment	Murdered at least three people in robberies in Düsseldorf and Giessen	
Schmidt, Beate	1989–1991	6	6	Committed to a psychiatric hospital	Known as "The Beast of Beelitz"; trans woman who killed five women and an infant in Beelitz	
Seel, Manfred	1971–2004	5	9	Died before crimes were discovered	Known as "The Hesse Ripper"; suspected of killing women in the Frankfurt Rhine-Main and other places; died before crimes were discovered	
Sprungk, Gabor	2007–2008	3	3	Committed suicide in prison	Known as "The Mansfeld Double Murderer"; killed a Swiss woman, and later an elderly woman and her doctor in Mansfeld in order to rob them	
Zschäpe, Beate	2000–2007	10	10	Sentenced to life imprisonment	Neo-Nazi who killed immigrants throughout Germany, with accomplices Uwe Böhnhardt and Uwe Mundlos	-

== Unidentified serial killers ==
Name	Years active	Proven victims	Possible victims	Region where active	Notes	Ref
Hamburg rubble murderer	1947	4	4	Hamburg	Killed 4 people during the cold winter in Hamburg; convicted serial killer Rudolf Pleil was questioned, but later cleared of these murders	
Münsterland murders	1971–1974	4	4+	North Rhine-Westphalia, Lower Saxony	Kidnapped and killed at least four hitchhikers in the Münster and Bentheim regions	
Pirmasens child killer	1960–1967	3	3	Rhineland-Palatinate	Suspected abductor and child killer responsible for the disappearance of three children from the town of Pirmasens	
Saw-Killer of Hanover	1975–1977	6	6+	Lower Saxony	Killed and dismembered at least four women and two men around Hanover, dumping their body parts at various places in the city	
Sewer Murders	1976–1989	7	7	Frankfurt Rhine-Main	Also called "The Sewage Plant Murders"; the bodies of several young boys and adolescents were discovered near sewage treatment plants in Frankfurt Rhine-Main, leading authorities to believe they were killed by a serial killer	

== See also ==
- Lists of serial killers
