= Hanebuth =

Hanebuth is a German surname. Notable people with the surname include:

- Frank Hanebuth (born 1964), German outlaw biker
- Jasper Hanebuth (1607–1653), German mercenary and criminal
