= Ernst-Dieter Beck =

German serial killer

- Born: 2 October 1940; Gohfeld, Germany
- Died: 29 April 2018 (aged 77); Fröndenberg Prison Hospital, Fröndenberg, Germany
- Conviction: Murder (3 counts)
- Penalty: Life imprisonment

Details
- Victims: 3
- Span of crimes: 1961–1968
- Country: West Germany
- Date apprehended: 1 March 1968

Ernst-Dieter Beck (2 October 1940 – 29 April 2018) was a German serial killer. He was the first person accused of murder in German legal history on whom a chromosome test was applied.

== Murders ==
Beck, who had repeatedly been convicted for theft, fraud, forgery, assault and sexual assault, murdered 23-year-old Ingrid K. on 8 April 1961. She had gone to a bachelor party, disappearing on the way home, and was later found strangled in a mill near Rehme. The case caused great interest because all 84 guests had to be interrogated very thoroughly by the police. The authorities also investigated over 1000 tracks, without finding the culprit. Several people were suspected, including the victim's father, who was never able to shake off the false accusation because he died before Beck's arrest.

On 25 May 1965, Beck murdered 29-year-old office worker Ursula F. She had met Beck in a dance hall and called him for a dance. After several visits to restaurants, Beck was invited by F. to her mother's apartment in Herford, inhabited at the time only by F.. There, he strangled her and left the apartment unseen. Since F. had planned a trip to the Netherlands at the time, she was not considered missing and was found by neighbours after ten days.

On 28 February 1968, Beck murdered 21-year-old store clerk Anneliese H. She was found the next day by a driver in a creek near Herford.

== Trial ==
Beck was arrested on 1 March 1968, due to a matching fingerprint found in Ursula F.s home. Although he denied involvement, he was admitted to a state psychiatric hospital in Marsberg for a psychiatric examination. There, he confessed to the local killings.

The special circumstances under which Beck was considered a murderer prompted his defense lawyer, Schlüter, to submit a request for evidence to obtain a cytogenic report from the Institute of Human Genetics at the University of Marburg. In forensic psychiatry, it has been argued that the chromosome shift in the sex-determining pair of chromosomes, from the normal combination XY to XYY in males, must result in a predisposition to violent crimes. In trials against killers in the United States and France, test results had already led to criminal mitigation.

In the trial against child murderer Jürgen Bartsch, the assizes court of Wuppertal rejected the application; however, the director of the district court of Bielefeld agreed with it, and the prosecutor's office did not object. It was the first time in German criminal and legal history that somebody accused of murder was subjected to a chromosome test. From the report prepared by the Marburg Institute of Human Genetics, it emerged that Beck had no probability of a shift from XY to XYY, according to the researchers. So he had the normal chromosome combination and could expect no mitigation from the court.

On 4 November 1968, Ernst-Dieter Beck was sentenced to three counts of life imprisonment for the three murders, which he served in the Werl Prison until his death in 2018.

== See also ==
- Jürgen Bartsch
- List of German serial killers
