= Tuba S. =

German murderer

Tuba Sezer
- Born: 1981 (age 44–45); Aachen, West Germany
- Convictions: Murder x3 Theft; Fraud
- Penalty: Life imprisonment

Details
- Victims: 3+
- Span of crimes: April – May 2016
- Country: Germany
- State: North Rhine-Westphalia
- Date apprehended: 25 May 2016

Tuba S. (born 1981) is a German murderer responsible for at least three murders in Düsseldorf and Giessen between April and May 2016. For her crimes, she was sentenced to life imprisonment with preventative detention.

== Early life ==
Tuba S. was born in Aachen in 1981. One of two children born to a car mechanic and his wife, she grew quite close to her father, in stark contrast to her mother, whom she regarded as an overtly strict and demanding woman. She was allegedly physically abused by an unspecified person as a child. Tuba S. received good grades at her grammar school, but in the end, failed to pass her Abitur due to receiving a low grade in her oral pedagogy class. After graduating from a university of applied sciences, she studied medicine for eight years, but never earned her degree because of her insomnia and frequent taking of zopiclone. When she was around 20, she came out as lesbian to her mother, which soured the relationship between them. She then began training as a nurse at Licher Hospital, but was fired for allegedly stealing from patients. Feeling that she had been treated unfairly, Tuba S. attempted suicide by overdosing on sleeping pills, but was found in the nick of time, resuscitated and interned at a mental hospital for a week.

After she was discharged, she returned to her previous workplace disguised as a doctor, where she stole medicine and cash from her colleagues, but was caught and then kicked out. Instead of deterring her, S. continued with a job in Giessen, where she wrote and forged counterfeit medical recipes. She later got a job as a cashier at a supermarket in Cologne, from where she later be fired after she was found guilty of fraud. After this stunt, she lived on benefits provided by the government's Hartz program.

== Murders ==
By March 2016, Tuba S. was in dire straits: she had made 72 credit inquiries in eight months, her girlfriend of several years had broken up with her and she was jobless. She then remembered about her wealthy former neighbour, 79-year-old magician Erich "Riconelly" Noll, who had reported for stealing from him two years prior. Between 1 and 3 April, she and several of her friends had planned a girls' night out by going to a concert, but Tuba S. temporarily withdrew, as she had contacted Noll by cellphone beforehand, asking if she could visit. Before going to his apartment, she bought disposable gloves and a few beers. When she arrived (it hasn't been clarified whether she was let in or entered by force), she hit Noll in the face, causing him to fall to the ground and hit his head. She then knelt on his chest and squeezed it tightly, slowly choking him to death. Tuba S. then ransacked the apartment, stealing a laptop, cash and the apartment key, before returning to her friends and attending the concert.

She returned to the apartment that same night, stacked packages of nappies under the bed and spread gasoline on the mattress, floor and shelf, and then a turpentine-soaked towel on the deceased man's face. She then took off the smoke alarms and set everything on fire, in an attempt to cover up her tracks. Two days later, she wrote to a friend that she "done something horrible" and desperately asked for 500–600 euros, but her friend refused to give her any. On 7 May, while walking down the street, Tuba S. came across 86-year-old Jole G. in Düsseldorf, who was going to visit her 53-year-old daughter Sylvia F. Taken aback by her gold jewellery, she followed the old woman to the apartment, where she broke in, knocked Jole G. to the ground, knelt on her chest and strangled her with her own scarf. She then laid in wait for the daughter to return, and when Sylvia F. came back, she too was knocked to the ground, hitting her head on the heater. Tuba S. then drugged her with zopiclone in an attempt to extort her out of her debit card codes, before ransacking the apartment, stealing wallets, jewellery, DVDs and a wedding ring. After that, she returned to her victim and smothered her with a pillow before manually strangling her to death. She then tried to stage the whole crime as a murder-suicide, lacing the floor with tablets and writing "I'm sorry Mom" in an open Sudoku notebook.

After fleeing the crime scene, she covered her face with a scarf and put on disposable gloves before entering a bank and withdrawing money from Sylvia F.'s account. She then tried to sell the stolen jewellery to dealers in Düsseldorf, Aachen and Berlin. When the bodies of the two women were found, investigators believed that Sylvia F. had indeed killed her and then committed suicide, despite a later autopsy disclosing that the cause of death was undetermined.

== Arrest ==
On 25 May 2016, Tuba S., who had previously been questioned in the Erich Noll murder, was arrested on suspicion of committing the crime after authorities learned that the alibi provided by her friends was false. After examining her apartment, investigators uncovered several stolen debit cards and silverware, which were traced back to Jole G. and Sylvia F. When the crime scene was reexamined, DNA traces belonging to Tuba S. were located.

On 14 December 2016, the programme Aktenzeichen XY… ungelöst aired an episode showcasing several cameras located in Tuba S.'s apartment. The police have thus far been able to determine whether these have been stolen or obtained during the commission of other homicides, and still looking for their rightful owners. One outlet also compared the Düsseldorf murders to a similar case in the same city from 2010, when an 86-year-old man and his 91-year-old wife were bludgeoned to death at their apartment in the Flingern neighbourhood. Medicaments were found next to their beds, in what appeared to be a staged suicide, but later on, the case was considered a homicide, as a woman wearing a headscarf was recorded withdrawing 7,000 euros from the male victim's debit card, first in Hanover and then in Greece. These murders remain unconnected and Tuba S. is not considered a suspect.

== Trial and imprisonment ==
The psychiatrist who was tasked with examining the defendant before her trial concluded that she had a psychopathic personality, demonstrating a lack of empathy or emotion towards her victims, as well as being manipulative towards those around her. in January 2018 she was convicted of the murders, the Judge sentenced her to life imprisonment and judged unfit for parole until she had served at least 30 years of her sentence. The Federal Court of Justice upheld the lower court's verdict on appeal.

== See also ==
- List of German serial killers

== In the media ==
- Crime Time: In the footsteps of a serial killer by Markus Cebulla, produced by Timeline Film +TV Hessischer Rundfunk, 2020. 45:11 Min. (in German)
