= Arthur Gatter =

German serial killer

- Born: 1940; Ravensburg, Germany
- Died: 12 December 1990 (aged 49–50); Giessen, Germany
- Other name: "The Hammer-Killer of Frankfurt"
- Penalty: Killed himself before he could be sentenced

Details
- Victims: 8
- Span of crimes: 2 February – 22 May 1990
- Country: West Germany
- State: Hesse
- Date apprehended: 22 May 1990

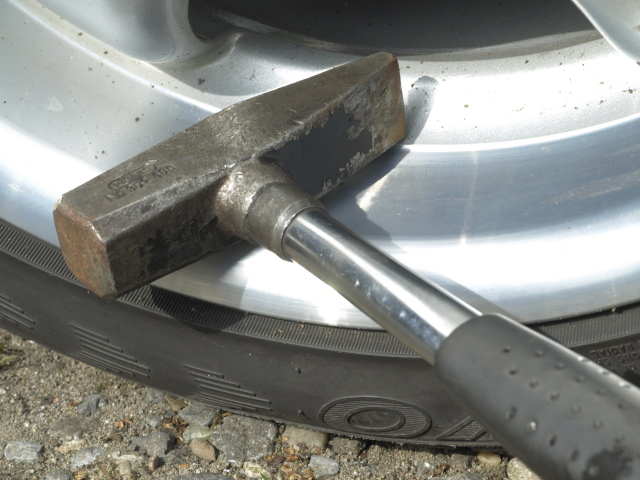
A metalwork hammer

Arthur Gatter (1940 – 12 December 1990), also known as the "Hammer Killer of Frankfurt", was a German serial killer.

== Life ==
Arthur Gatter was an electrician by profession and lived for a period in Australia. After returning to Germany, he worked in assembly. From the 1980s onward, he was no longer able to work and caused significant damage to his apartment on Wilhelm-Leuschner-Straße. It is believed that his schizophrenia was already at an advanced stage during this period. In his subsequent residence in Bornheim, he continued to exhibit suspicious behaviour. At times, he was examined at a clinic for psychiatry and psychotherapy in Haina.

== Murders ==
The murders occurred between 1 February and 22 May 1990 on the outskirts of Frankfurt. At the time, Frankfurt had approximately 2,400 homeless people living in the city, particularly in its greener areas.

- 2 February 1990: A crime scene was discovered on Weißfrauenstraße. A security guard found the body of 43-year-old homeless man Hans-Peter "Peterchen" S. at around 5:00 a.m.
- 7 February 1990: Another victim, 22-year-old Kurt Helmut H., was found with fatal head injuries. As he was not homeless, no immediate connection was initially made to the first victim.
- 2 April 1990: At a bus stop on Rechneigrabenstraße, homeless man Helmut R. was found at approximately 5:40 a.m. with severe head injuries that resulted in his death.
- 3 April 1990: Two victims were killed near the Eschenheimer Anlage.
- 9 April 1990: Helmut R. was murdered in Ostzeil.
- 4 May 1990: The body of 46-year-old Hans-Peter M. was found at around 7:30 a.m.
- 5 May 1990: Sixty-year-old Engelbert G. and 42-year-old Nicola Z. were killed approximately 50 metres apart. A crime scene photograph showing a bloodstained park bench illustrated the severity of the attack. This brought the number of homeless victims murdered within a 24-hour period to three.
- 20 May 1990: Brazilian national Anderson S. reportedly followed a man into a bush, allegedly for a sexual encounter. He was instead stabbed but initially survived. The severely injured man fled and collapsed on a park bench, where he was subsequently killed by the attacker.
- 22 May 1990: Heinrich O. became the final victim attributed to the Hammer Killer. A local resident witnessed the incident and alerted the police. A suspect was arrested approximately 12 minutes after the murder.

== Investigation ==
Following the deaths on 3 April, police established a special task force, codenamed Berber, under the leadership of Commissioner Karlheinz Wagner, and implemented a range of investigative measures. These included placing mannequins on park benches as potential decoys and deploying plainclothes officers to act as bait for the offender. Police also used surveillance techniques, including concealed cameras placed in birdhouses, in an attempt to apprehend the perpetrator in the act. However, diffuse park lighting and the limited camera technology available at the time failed to produce usable images. In addition, inquiries with dry-cleaning businesses about bloodstained clothing did not yield results. Fear among the homeless population increased, prompting the city to provide additional shelters and keep underground stations open overnight so that fewer people would need to sleep on park benches.

On 11 April 1990, a homeless man reported witnessing a person approach someone who was sleeping and strike them with a blunt object. A facial composite was produced, and a suspect was arrested in Gallus but was later released due to insufficient evidence.

On 22 May 1990, Arthur Gatter was arrested in connection with the hammer murders. A metalworking hammer was seized as the suspected murder weapon; he had been carrying it concealed in a plastic bag under his arm. Forensic examination determined that the characteristic impression fractures and perforating injuries to the skull were consistent with blows from such a tool. According to investigators, Gatter systematically sought out victims sleeping on park benches and attacked them by surprise. He reportedly observed them beforehand to ensure he could act without interruption and wore low-noise rubber gloves to avoid detection. The force of the blows was such that blood was found several metres from the victims.

A psychiatric report prepared at the time found that he met the criteria for an insanity defense. Before court proceedings could take place, Gatter died by suicide on 12 December 1990, having hanged himself with a gauze bandage.

== See also ==
- List of German serial killers
