= Frank Gust =

German serial killer (born 1969)

- Born: 24 May 1969 (age 57); Oberhausen, West Germany
- Other name: The Rhein-Ruhr Ripper
- Conviction: Murder
- Penalty: Life Imprisonment

Details
- Victims: 4
- Span of crimes: 1994–1998
- Country: Germany
- State: Rhine-Ruhr
- Date apprehended: 1999

Frank Gust (born 24 May 1969) is a German serial killer. He has been dubbed The Rhine-Ruhr Ripper by the media because his actions, mainly committed in the Rhine-Ruhr region in western Germany, share similarities with London's Jack the Ripper murders.

Gust is classified as a sexual sadist. At a very young age, he showed a tendency to abuse animals, experiencing sexual arousal when torturing, killing, and gutting animals. At age 13 he began breaking into morgues to act on his necrophiliac inclinations. After he was arrested, Gust stated that his greatest desire was to touch the beating heart of a dying woman.

Between 1994 and 1998 Gust killed four women. His first victim was a 28-year-old hitchhiker from South Africa who lived in the Netherlands and was on a European trip. Her decapitated body was found in a forest area near Ede. In 1996 and 1998 Gust killed two prostitutes, whom he had picked up from Essen central station. His presumed last victim was a 47-year-old aunt of his wife. Gust placed the mutilated bodies of his victims in such a way that they could be discovered soon after the murder. However, the body of his aunt-in-law has never been found.

In 1999 Gust indicated to his mother that he had committed a murder. She told a friend of hers, who informed the police, and Gust was arrested shortly afterwards. On 21 September 2000, he was sentenced to life imprisonment for killing the four women. Gust started a therapy which he quit after only six months, proclaiming that he wasn't treatable and would always remain a threat to other people. He is scheduled to be released in 2026.

== See also ==
- List of German serial killers
