= Egidius Schiffer =

German serial killer

- Born: Leo Egidius Schiffer; 1956; West Germany
- Died: 22 July 2018 (aged 61–62); Bochum, Germany
- Other name: "The Strangler of Aachen"
- Conviction: Murder x5
- Penalty: Life imprisonment

Details
- Victims: 5
- Span of crimes: 1983–1990
- Country: West Germany
- Date apprehended: March 2007

Leo Egidius Schiffer (1956 – 21/22 July 2018) was a German serial killer, who was known as The Strangler of Aachen. Between 1983 and 1990, he murdered five girls and women between the ages of 15 and 31, abusing three of them sexually. His crimes were known as "hitchhiker killings" or "Disco-murders". In 1985, the programme Aktenzeichen XY… ungelöst covered his case.

== Murders ==
The first murder was committed in July 1983 near Alsdorf: the 18-year-old Marion Gerecht was at a bus stop when she was attacked by Schiffer. When he attacked her, she fought him and trampled his windshield. Although she was able to prevent a rape, she was strangled, stripped and thrown into a fishing pond.

In February 1984, Schiffer attacked 15-year-old Andrea Wernicke near the nightclub “Rockfabrik“ in Übach-Palenberg near Geilenkirchen. She habitually hitchhiked home after visiting the nightclub. He raped her before strangling her and dumping her body near an open field.

On 31 August 1984, 17-year-old Angelika Sehl got into Schiffer's car and was murdered.

In December 1985, 18-year-old Marion Lauven was abducted, raped and killed in Aachen. She too had been standing at a bus stop. For an hour, Schiffer drove across the region with the body in the trunk until he found a place to drop it off. He covered her bare body with leaves and then left.

On 16 June 1990, Sabine Neumann disappeared in Niederkrüchten on the way home from the nightclub "Inside". Schiffer had dragged the 31-year-old into his Mercedes, where he raped and strangled her. A year later, her skeletonized remains were found by passersby in a forest near Wegberg. The body was identified based on dental records.

== Arrest and conviction ==
In March 2007 Egidius Schiffer was caught and arrested in Heinsberg while trying to steal scrap metal. He voluntarily gave a saliva sample, which resulted in him being exposed as the perpetrator of the five murders. He was arrested on 23 August for murder. During the confession, he confessed to the five murders, but recanted his confessions before the district court on the grounds that he had sadomasochistic tendencies. He only admitted to the murders because the thought of pre-trial detention and punishment had aroused him. Schiffer also alleged that he was forced to confess.

However, the court relied on the repeated confession of Schiffer which also had "disclosed perpetrator's knowledge", as well as the DNA traces present at the crime scenes.

He was sentenced on 19 August 2008 to life imprisonment by the Aachen Regional Court for five counts of murder and two counts of rape. The court also noted the particular severity of the guilt. A revision was rejected by the Federal Court of Justice in June 2009.

== Death ==
On the morning of 22 July 2018, Schiffer was found dead in his cell in the Bochum correctional facility. He had connected his body to the power grid using multiple cables, attached to his nipples and penis, to support autoerotic practices, and he died as a result of heart arrhythmia.

== See also ==
- List of German serial killers
