= Horst David =

German criminal (1938–2020)

- Born: 22 November 1938; Breslau, Nazi Germany
- Died: 8 November 2020 (aged 81); Straubing, Germany
- Conviction: Murder
- Penalty: Life imprisonment

Details
- Victims: 3–7+
- Span of crimes: 1975–1993
- Country: Germany
- State: Bavaria
- Date apprehended: August 1995

Horst David (22 November 1938 – 8 November 2020) was a German serial killer.

== Life ==
David was born in Breslau, Germany (today Wrocław, Poland). After completing a painter's apprenticeship as a hired painter, he moved to the Hainsacker district near Regensburg. In 1963, he married. He and his wife had two sons.

He stayed away from his home for days at a time, instead spending time in Munich and Hamburg (most likely in other cities too), where he spent much of his money on women, leading to financial difficulties. On 22 August 1975, during one of these trips to Munich, he murdered Waltraud Frank and, two days later, Fatima Grossart. The two prostitutes were strangled, and their homes were searched. Later, David stated that he quarrelled with both victims because they had demanded more money than what was agreed to.

After being fired from his job and divorcing his wife, he moved to Regensburg in 1984 and lived on welfare.

Eighteen years after the Munich murders, on 7 September 1993, David's neighbour, Mathilde Steindl, was strangled in her apartment. The police, who included David as the main suspect in the preliminary investigation, arrested him after his fingerprints were found in the deceased's apartment. There was no conviction, however, because David was apparently temporarily residing in a neighbour's apartment.

His fingerprints were routinely sent to the Bavarian State Office of Criminal Investigation by the authorities. In 1994, the then-new Automated Fingerprint Identification System (AFIS) made a match with the fingerprints on Fatima Grossart's body.

In the following police investigations, David initially denied being in Munich in August 1975 and visiting any prostitutes. When he was confronted with evidence, he admitted to the murders of the two prostitutes, in addition to several others. As well as his neighbour, he also confessed to the following:

- Barbara Ernst, 59, on 12 April 1981
- Martha Lorenz, 67, on 26 January 1983
- Maria Bergmann, 70, on 27 October 1984
- Kunigunda Thoss, 84, on 22 January 1992

The three victims from 1981 to 1984 wanted to hire him as an assistant for the renovation of their homes but refused to lend him money or pay for the services. Thoss let him borrow 20,000 Deutsche Marks over time. The three murders weren't initially recognised as murders until the confession of Horst David, who arranged them to look like household accidents.

David confessed to seven murders. According to the then-investigator Josef Wilfling, financial gain also played a role in the murders. It is believed that David committed more murders. Among other things, his unusually high age at the time of his first proven murder and his daylong jogs also contribute to this. Josef Wilfling said that the brief period between the first two murders, the circumstances, and his behaviour would suggest that David already had experience in that area.

David was sentenced to life imprisonment by the Regional Court of Munich in December 1995. To his death, he resided in Straubing Prison. He died on 8 November 2020.

== Crime story ==
The investigation of Fatima Grossart's murder is regarded as a milestone in German crime history, as it was here for the first time that a 20-year-old crime was resolved with the help of the computer-assisted tracking system of AFIS.

== Literature ==
- Rudolf Schröck: Der Biedermann. Die Geschichte des Frauenmörders Horst David. Knaur, Munich 2004, ISBN 3-426-77721-5.

== Film ==
- Der Mann, dem die Frauen vertrauten-Der Serienmörder Horst David. Regie: Walter Harrich (ARD, 2008), with Ulrich Tukur and others (documentary with scenes and interviews)

== See also ==
- List of German serial killers
