= Hamburg rubble murderer =

German serial killer in 1947

The Hamburg rubble murderer is the name of an unidentified German serial killer, supposedly responsible for a series of murders in Hamburg during early 1947.

== Murders ==
In total, four victims were found:

- 20 January 1947: in a deserted factory lot on the Baustraße (today the Hinrichsenstraße), the body of a young woman (about 18 to 20 years old) was found by playing children. A millimetre-wide trace of drying on the neck of the deceased indicated that she had been strangled with a string.
- 25 January 1947: at the Lappenbergsallee in Eimsbüttel, at the top of House No. 2, the body of an unclothed man aged between 65 and 70 was found by scrap collectors. Forensic scientists suspected that the time of death was between 23 and 25 January.
- 1 February 1947: in the elevator shaft of a bombed-out house of a former mattress factory on Billstrasse, near Billekanal, the strangled body of a 6-year-old naked girl was found.
- 12 February 1947: in Anckelmannstrasse, Hammerbrook, the final victim's body was located; a woman, about 30 to 35 years old, naked and also strangled.

The identities of the victims were never discovered. All victims were robbed, unclothed and strangled. Another commonality was that the murdered were in generally well-kept condition. Some circumstances indicated that greed could have been the motive. Despite the bodies being found at intervals of about seven days, the locality was never the same, and there were no signs of a fight present. The investigators did, however, detect grinding marks on some pointed rubble stones. The perpetrator has never been captured.

== Investigations ==
The police investigation was led by Chief Commissioner Ingwersen. The Hamburg Police warned the population to be wary of strangers approaching them in homeless shelters and waiting rooms, and that driving with a personal driver was dangerous.

None of the victims were reported missing, including that of the little girl. It was assumed that the murdered persons were transients who had stopped over in Hamburg.

For clues that could lead to the capture of the offender, a reward of 5,000 Reichsmark and 1,000 cigarettes was offered. After some time, the reward was raised to 10,000 Reichsmark. The police advised the public "to walk along the center of the street to avoid being attacked from a cellar hole". Around 50,000 posters of the offender were plastered in all four occupation territories.

Even after a request to the professional associations of dentists for one of the victims' dentures, no clues were discovered. Registry offices were requested to issue death certificates. One theory sought the perpetrator's motive of being a hereditary stalker who had murdered a complete family to gain possession of the heritage. A total of 1,000 people were interviewed, according to police reports. At dispensaries, ration stamps were used by people who had not picked up their cards lately. The searches took place in station waiting rooms, restaurants and bunkers, which served as an asylum for bombed people.

Inspector Hans Lühr, head of the "Killing Offenses Inspectorate" and one of the most renowned experts in this field, assumed that the perpetrator was a single individual. He also believed that the victims were four family members and that the culprit was the "fifth link in the chain".

A landlady testified that the male victim could have been her tenant, but this lead was disproven when the missing man later contacted her.

The case of the Hamburg rubble murderer had certain parallels to the serial killer Rudolf Pleil, who killed out of greed and sexual motives at least 10 women. Pleil was brought to the scene near the Berliner Tor, however, his alibi was credible enough to discount any connection to the case. Nor could a connection to a series of murders of taxi drivers, which occurred at the same time in Hamburg, be established. In the statistics from 1946 to 1964, 268 out of a total 320 murder cases were investigated by the Hamburg Police, but the case of Rubble Murderer was not among them. The investigation files are still available in the Hamburg State Archives.

== Literary processing ==
The material of the unresolved criminal case was processed by Cay Rademacher in his novel The Rubble Murderer. Rademacher describes the investigation work of Inspector General Frank Stave, who was entrusted with the case. In 2016, the novel Trümmerkind by Mechthild Borrmann was published, which ties in with the rubble murders and contains a fictitious story of the victims as a family.

== See also ==
- List of fugitives from justice who disappeared
- List of German serial killers

== Literature ==
- Cay Rademacher: Der Trümmermörder. Dumont Buchverlag; Auflage: 7 (12. Oktober 2011), ISBN 978-3832161545.
- Mechthild Borrmann: Trümmerkind. Droemer Verlag, 2016, ISBN 978-3-426-28137-6
