= Marco Metzler =

German serial killer

Marco Metzler (born 1978) is a German serial killer, who attacked women on the highways between Hesse and North Rhine-Westphalia from 2003 to 2006, raping four and killing three of them.

== Crimes ==
- 15 November 2003 – Nicole U., called „Sammy“ (32 years), Cologne. The prostitute from Oberhausen was found semi naked and strangled in a bush on the site of a construction market in Dormagen. The victim had numerous cuts. She worked 33 kilometres away on the street at Cologne's Militaryring-Street, where she was most likely picked up by her murderer. During the subsequent interrogation, Metzler said that it was "one of the most beautiful days in his life".
- 19 October 2004 – Asta J. (25 years), Moers. The Lithuanian prostitute reported that she had been almost strangled by a man and almost slashed with a knife. The crime occurred on the A 57 motorway near Moers. She survived the attack and made statements to the police that the attacker had eye-catching scars on his body.
- 1 November 2005 – Aneta B. (31 years), Dillenburg. The undressed corpse of the Pole was found on the A 45 motorway near Siegen. It is assumed that the woman was overwhelmed in a phone booth, and was missing for over several days. Aneta B. was probably abused in an empty house in Haiger for several hours by the perpetrator.
- 8 July 2006 – Anna S. (18 years), Kassel. The student was attacked on her way home and strangled by the perpetrator. Sexual acts were performed on the corpse, which was then disposed of on the A49 highway between Kassela and Fritzlar. DNA traces of Anna S. finally led to the capture of Metzler. After a short time, he made a comprehensive confession during the police hearing.

== The offender ==
Marco Metzler grew up with two sisters in Haiger. The boy was described as a typical "mama's boy", who often quarrelled with his father. He went to a Hauptschule, and after a job at the railway, he became a truck driver at a freight forwarder. In 2003, Metzler married and became the father of a child. It was later learned that the couple had relationship issues and Marco frequently visited prostitutes. In addition, he had increasing financial issues and problems with alcoholism, with his wife eventually divorcing him. On 30 August 2006, Marco Metzler was arrested in Haiger by the "Eisern" squad in his parents' house. During the subsequent investigation, the perpetrator filed a complete confession. He was also identified by the surviving victim Asta J.

== Modus operandi ==
During the trial before the district court of Limburg an der Lahn, an attempt was made to figure out the motive. The only fact known about the killer was that he had a disturbing sex life. Investigators also wondered why the killings happened about a year apart, why he sometimes had intercourse with women prior to the murder, and then dispose of them like an object. According to the testimony of one of his victims, the prostitute Asta J., who was attacked on 19 October 2004 on the streets in Cologne, and that he behaved to her "like an animal". Marco Metzler is said to have tried to choke her with a rope shortly after boarding. She was able to escape, but was captured by the physically superior man again and tied down in the bunk of a truck. At a stop near Neukirchen, she was raped. The offender injured her with a knife, but Asta J. managed to hide in a nearby cornfield. When Metzler was questioned, he replied that "he also did not know what had come over him". He had no remorse for his victims, and in the opinion of the prosecutor, for him the victims only played a role as a body that he could dispose of.

== Charges ==
The indictment from the prosecutor Frank Späth was denominated for murder (murder for satisfying the sexual drive), attempted murder, assault, false imprisonment and rape with particularly severe coincidence. The perpetrator was occupied by numerous indications. DNA of the victims were found on a knife and gloves belonging to the offender. In addition, jewels from the murdered women were found in his possession. The crime scenes near highways brought the police relatively quickly to the fact that it was most likely the offender was a long-distance driver. In 2007, Marco Metzler was sentenced by the district court of Limburg an der Lahn because of the particular severity of guilt to life imprisonment with subsequent security detention. The verdict cited the pronounced sexual drive of the offender and his unprecedented brutality in the practice of the offence. Acts that would blow up the imagination of the court. "It was always about dominating the body of women, dead or alive. Their appearance did not matter, he was not a necrophiliac, he felt "no satisfaction in killing", it was said in the verdict. A reviewer certified him low intelligence and lack of empathy, but still considered him fully guilty, which had a great impact on the sentence. "The deeds were prepared, went according to plan and has left nothing to chance", was the verdict of the presiding judge Karin Walter.

== Reception ==
In January 2017, the WDR took up the case in the first episode of the documentary series WDR-Crime: Das Profil des Bösen and reported on the investigation.

== See also ==
- Volker Eckert
- List of German serial killers
