= Saw-Killer of Hanover =

Unidentified German serial killer

The Saw-Killer of Hanover (German: Sägemörder von Hannover) is the name of an unidentified German serial killer, who is supposedly responsible for murdering and dismembering at least four women and two men, whose body parts were found in Hanover and the surrounding area in the 1970s. None of the victims have been identified, and the case is also referred to as The Found Corpses of Hanover. The "SOKO Torso" Unit of the Hanoverian police, directed by Commissioner Günter Nowatius, investigated the murders at the time.

== Discovery ==
A total of 13 body parts were found in the years from 1975 to 1977, including a severed forearm at a power plant, a lower body in the city park and a torso on a dirt road.

- On 26 September 1975, the first corpse was found at the hydroelectric power plant Schneller Graben, near Maschsee. The torso of a young woman was found by a worker. The breasts of the deceased were severed and the abdomen cleared. The body had probably been in the water for about 10 to 14 days. The woman was about 23 to 25 years old and 155 cm tall. She had a scar on her abdomen and had given birth to at least one child. The body had been tied together with a decoration cord. The Special Commission designated the corpse as Torso 1; it was probably cut with either a saw (circular or band saw) or a surgical instrument, used to sever the torso from the woman's arms and legs. Despite having the fingerprints examined, authorities could not identify the victim.
- In the period from 21 to 28 February 1976, two upper halves of a body and the leg of a woman aged 25 years old, with a height of about 170 cm were found. The time of death had to have occurred 2 to 3 weeks before finding the body parts. The two halves of the thorax were later discovered between parked cars at the Hanoverian Landesfunkhaus Niedersachsen. The other leg was found in a dumpster by students of the local girls' school in the street Bonner Straße. Other body parts were found floating in the Leine at Rudolf-von-Bennigsen-Ufer or close to the Maschsee.
- In the period from 28 May to 11 June 1977, six body parts from a young man were found at the hydroelectric power plant, always on the weekends. The victim was estimated to be 17 to 18 years old, and around 170 cm tall. He also had an Iron Cross tattooed on his upper body.
- On 5 June, the arm of an approximately 50-year-old man was found, again at the power plant.
- On 10 July, the lower body of a woman was discovered by a person walking along the Eilenriede forest. The victim was at least 40 years old and was around 150 to 160 cm tall, wore a shoe size of 5 1/2, had an appendectomy scar, had given birth to at least one child and suffered from atherosclerosis. The lower body had been severed with a machine saw. The findings from 1977 assured the coroner that the victims had suffered violence before being murdered.
- On 18 December, the last corpse from the series was discovered on a dirt road near Hanover. The upper body of a 50- to 60-year-old woman was found wrapped up in an old cotton blanket, had strangulation marks on the neck, and both her arms and legs had been cut off. The woman was between 160 and 170 cm tall, had also had an appendectomy and given birth to at least one child. An autopsy revealed that her death was caused by suffocation.

== Investigation ==
The common pattern from all the found corpses is that for most of the victims, the cause of death could not be determined. They had only been dead for a short time before discovery and were cut up with a saw or surgical instrument. The whereabouts of the rest of the bodies remain unknown. The body parts were always disposed of on Saturdays in conspicuous places, so that they could easily be found by passers-by. According to Chief Detective Günter Nowatius, who investigated the case, the police had "no crime scene, no time of the crime, and neither the perpetrator's nor the victim's identity", and once the eleven individual body parts were assigned anatomically to the six victims, the situation complicated further: According to SOKO "Torso", the offender did not have profound anatomical knowledge, with the cuts being made at the joints suggesting it might be the work of a butcher. It is striking that the perpetrators had no aspirations to hide body parts of the victims, but even with a certain "exhibitionist tendency" within two kilometres of the city near Maschsee, he dumped them not far from where the police headquarters of Hanover were located.

The main obstacle to the investigation was the fact that none of the victims' identities were discovered. According to Nowatius, the offender would otherwise have "barely a chance to remain undetected". The perpetrator-victim relationships remained unknown. Investigations in local morgues, surveys of undertakers and the systematic comparison of missing persons did not uncover any clues. No missing person would fit with the body parts discovered.

One possible motive could be the intention to put the inhabitants of Hanover into a panic. The criminologist Stephan Harbort suspected that this person was a "highly pathological" perpetrator. Police suspected that the perpetrator was on weekday employment and had to store the bodies cool in the meantime, and then transport them on the weekend by car and leave them in conspicuous places where there was much traffic.

The case gained popularity after being broadcast on Aktenzeichen XY… ungelöst, with a very strong interest and cooperative participation from the audience. The fact that the murders ended abruptly in 1977 meant that the culprit probably changed his residence, was jailed at a correctional facility for another offence, or had died.

== Recent developments: Olaf Weinert and the Andrea B. case ==
More than 20 years later, in 1999, the case regained relevance when a female torso was found in Isenbüttel. This discovery led to the trial of a former butcher's apprentice Olaf Weinert from Walkenried, who confessed to this murder and was also convicted of other homicides. The first murder was a retiree from Celle who had been killed and dismembered by him. Weinert sought out his victims, among other things, from the street on Moorwaldweg, which was then located near the dump on Altwarmbüchener Lake. However, no connection could be established with the bodies from the 1970s.

In autumn 2012, a similar case occurred, in which Ukrainian-German rapper and neo-Nazi Sash JM (real name Alexander K.), called the "Maschsee Killer", also dismembered his victim. The police took the 25-year-old violent offender, who by then had been admitted in a psychiatric clinic. The motive for the crime was murder. Andrea B. had probably been a victim of chance. Alexander K. was released early on 30.05.2025.

== See also ==
- List of fugitives from justice who disappeared
- List of German serial killers
- List of unsolved murders (1900–1979)
