= Bernhard Prigan =

German serial killer (born 1920)

- Born: 1920 (age 105–106); Germany
- Other names: "The Strangler" "The Highway Killer"
- Conviction: Murder
- Penalty: Life imprisonment

Details
- Victims: 3–16
- Span of crimes: 1947–1952
- Country: Allied-occupied Germany, West Germany
- Date apprehended: 7 November 1952

Bernhard Prigan (born 1920) is a German serial killer who killed at least three women between the end of the 1940s and the early 1950s.

Prigan always sought his victims in the immediate vicinity of controlled-access highways and major roads, and it is unknown how many of these so-called "Highway murders" he committed. He was described by the press as "The Strangler" and "The Highway Killer".

On 7 November 1952, Prigan was arrested in a village near Mannheim. He confessed to three murders, including the murder of 49-year-old seamstress Wilma Sulzer from Altlußheim five days earlier. A bread crust found at the crime scene near the main road to Mannheim contributed to his arrest. Based on this, authorities tracked down the bread factory's location. There, a trader described seeing a man with a headband. A patrolman, whom Prigan had asked for directions, later recalled talking to him. On the day of his arrest, he had killed 51-year-old housewife Margarethe Pohl in the forest with a club. He was observed by a student, who fled out of fear. Prigan caught up to him, asking him about a pump and advising him not to go to the woods any more, as there were "drunk guys".

On 19 December 1953, Prigan was sentenced to three terms of life imprisonment after four days of trial. Unlike today, a total sentence of several life imprisonments was not yet formed.

== See also ==
- List of serial killers by number of victims
- List of German serial killers
