= Maria Velten =

German serial killer

- Born: 1916; Kempen, Germany
- Died: June 9, 2008 (aged 91–92)
- Other names: "Bilberry Mariechen" "The Poison Witch from Lower Rhine"
- Conviction: Murder
- Penalty: Life imprisonment

Details
- Victims: 3–5
- Span of crimes: 1963–1982
- Country: West Germany

Maria Velten (1916 – June 9, 2008) was a German serial killer, who was sentenced to life imprisonment for three murders. Maria Velten died in 2008 in a nursing home after having been released from prison for health reasons.

Velten was a war widow with six children, two of them conceived after the war. In 1983, she was arrested after one of her daughters-in-law told her lawyer that her mother-in-law had poisoned her two husbands. Following investigations by the police revealed that Velten had killed in about 20 years - from 1963 to 1982 - a total of five people: her father, an aunt, two husbands and a partner. She mixed parathion with bilberry pudding, as the colour of the pudding covered the blue warning colour of the poison. Therefore, she was referred to in the tabloid press as "Bilberry Mariechen" and "The Poison Witch from Lower Rhine".

Maria Velten killed mainly for financial reasons; however, most of the time she did not spend on herself, but gave it to her children and grandchildren.

In 2009, a documentary about Velten was broadcast on German television (ARD). The accompanying text from the film states:

"Here we have the classic case of a poison murder series committed by a woman. Women usually kill out of a situation of weakness to protect themselves or their families in a situation that is considered unbearable. If the deed succeeds because it has gone undetected, the temptation to undertake the seemingly simple way of solving conflicts again becomes great. Also witnessed in women who had always been perceived as weak and as victims, the killings give a sense of power: they will master over life and death in their environment."

The case was also featured in a RTL series Anwälte der Toten.

== Film ==
- ARD: The Bilberry Mariechen. Documentary by Ute Bönnen and Gerald Endres. (2009)

== See also ==
- List of German serial killers
