= Ferdinand Wittmann =

German serial killer

- Born: 11 September 1836; Koblenz, German Confederation
- Died: After 1870; German Confederation
- Conviction: Murder
- Penalty: Death; commuted to life imprisonment

Details
- Victims: 6
- Span of crimes: 1860–1865
- Country: German Confederation

Ferdinand Wittmann (11 September 1836 – after 1870) was a German sixfold poisoner who used arsenic.

== Life ==
After his training as a bookbinder, he opened a bookbindery in Wollin in 1859. He married four times between 1860 and 1865, and from these marriages, he fathered two children and became the stepfather of another girl.

== Victims ==
Emilie Maria Wittmann (née Gehm)

Wittmann married Emilie Maria Gehm in Wollin on 16 November 1860, with whom he fathered two children; Johannes (according to another source Hugo) and Louis.

In the period from 3 to 16 September, the local hospital treated Mrs. Wittmann, who died nonetheless. In the death certificate, it was stated that her death was the result of endometritis.

Wittmann received life insurance from a company called Germania.

Johannes Wittmann

His son Johannes fell ill on 31 January 1863 and died despite medical care by the local Sanitätsrat Schmurr on 2 February 1863.

Auguste Charlotte Wittmann (née Höhn)

Wittmann then married on 15 June 1863 Auguste Charlotte Höhn, who died on 22 December 1863.

Auguste Wittmann (née Kornotzky)

Soon afterwards, on 1 April 1864, Wittmann married Auguste Kornotzky (also spelt Kornitzki), who died on 15 August 1865.

Mrs. Böse

Wittmann married on 17 October 1865 in Wollin the widow of the drowned in September 1864 ship captain Böse, thus becoming a stepfather to the orphaned Georgine Auguste Alwine Böse. On 13 July 1866, she gave birth to another child. He moved with his wife, their daughter and his 3-year-old son Louis to Poznań. His wife fell ill on 17 September 1866 and died untreated on the following day. Oberstabsarzt Mayer and chief physician Laube could only determine the cause of death.

Georgine Auguste Alwine Böse

The child fell ill on 22 October 1865, and received medical treatment from Vienna on the following day, once in the morning and the evening. On the night of 23 to 24 October, the doctor, Dr. Wiener, said that the cause of death was meningitis.

Heinrich Schönborn (1804–1893) was the second pastor of the Kreuzkirche community and gave Wittmann permission for the translocation of his stepdaughter.

== Preliminary investigation ==
On the request of Edmund Bärensprung (1816–1868), Chief of Police in Poznań, an autopsy was performed on Mrs. Wittmann's body.

To determine the cause of death on 17 October 1866, the bodies of all the dead relatives of Wittmann were exhumed in Wollin's Protestant Cemetery.

== Criminal proceedings ==
The jury trial was scheduled for 17 February 1868 and opened on 22 June 1868. His defender was the later Justice Council August Dockhorn. The charge was represented by Justice H. Schmnieden, represented in the appellate court in Poznań. Wittmann was convicted of murder and sentenced to death. His death sentence was commuted to life imprisonment on 14 April 1870.

The procedure was also reported by the foreign press.

== See also ==
- List of German serial killers

== Literature ==
- Julius Eduard Hitzig, Willibald Alexis: The new Pitaval. Leipzig, 1869.
