= Thomas Holst =

German serial killer (born 1964)

- Born: 18 February 1964 (age 62); West Germany
- Other name: "Heidemörder"
- Conviction: Murder
- Penalty: Committed to a psychiatric clinic

Details
- Victims: 3
- Span of crimes: 1987–1989
- Country: West Germany

Thomas Holst (born 18 February 1964) is a German serial killer who became known as the Heidemörder (heath murderer).

== Events ==
Between 1987 and 1989, Holst raped, tortured and dismembered three women in the south of Hamburg. A psychiatric report described Holst as "untreatable and with extreme relapse probability."

On 27 September 1995, his former therapist Tamar Segal helped him escape from the high-security wing of Klinikum Nord's forensic science of the former LBK Hamburg in Langenhorn. The police search was initially inconclusive, but suspicion arose against Segal. After this escape assistant had been arrested three months after the escape, Holst surrendered himself on 30 December 1995 at Police Station 31 in Hamburg's Uhlenhorst.

On 13 March 1997, Holst and Segal got married in the Hamburg Detention Center. In 2003, the district court of Hamburg dismissed Holst's claim to the consummation to Segal. It was about involuntary treatment, to meet regularly without observation with his wife in a visitor's room of the hospital north. The hospital refused this, pointing to the danger to his wife's life and threatened her with the risk of absconding. Holst appealed against the judicial relief, but it was unsuccessful.

== Victims ==
- Andrea Grube-Nagel (killed 25 November 1987): The 21-year-old student was forced on the way from the Rissen train station to her parents' house into Holst's car when he threatened her with a knife. Her body was found two days later in Kaltenkirchen.
- Petra Maaßen (killed 11 February 1988): The 28-year-old Rahlstedt housewife was forced while leaving a restaurant 400 metres away from her home, when Holst threatened her with a knife and forced her into his car. Maaßen's mutilated corpse was found a day later in a field in Bargfeld-Stegen.
- Lara Holz (killed 27 November 1989): The 22-year-old cosmetic student climbed into Holst's car after she had missed her bus. Holst had noticed this and then offered her a ride. Her remains were found five days later in Luheheide.

== See also ==
- List of German serial killers
