= Gabor Sprungk =

German serial killer and rapist

- Born: Gabor Torsten Sprungk; 1971; Bräunrode, Saxony-Anhalt, East Germany
- Died: January 9, 2018 (aged 46); JVA Burg Prison, Magdeburg, Saxony-Anhalt, Germany
- Cause of death: Suicide
- Convictions: Murder x3 Various other crimes
- Penalty: Life imprisonment with preventive detention x3 (murders); Various (other crimes)

Details
- Victims: 3
- Span of crimes: 2007–2008
- Country: Germany
- State: Saxony-Anhalt
- Date apprehended: For the last time on July 1, 2008

Gabor Torsten Sprungk (1971 – January 9, 2018), known as The Mansfeld Double Murderer (German: Doppelmörder von Mansfeld), was a German serial killer and rapist who killed an elderly woman and her doctor in Mansfeld in 2008, and was later linked to the earlier murder of a woman he had dated the year prior. Deemed as the most dangerous prisoner in Saxony-Anhalt, he killed himself in prison in 2018.

== Early life and crimes ==
Gabor Sprungk was born in 1971 in the hamlet of Friedrichrode, located within Bräunrode, East Germany. Little is known about his early life, but he began committing crimes at age 16 and would be repeatedly arrested for rape, sexual assault, possession of a gun, driving without a license and embezzlement. Sprungk is known to have served in the French Foreign Legion at one point, but his activities during this time period are unknown.

Following the German reunification, Sprungk committed a series of rapes and brutal assaults against prostitutes, for which he was convicted and ordered to serve 8 years imprisonment at a prison in Halle. After serving out the sentence in full, he was released from prison and moved to Altstätten, Switzerland, where he lived under an alias.

== Murders ==
While living in Altstätten, Sprungk used an online dating site to become acquainted with 47-year-old Maria Kämpf-Riberio, a divorced saleswoman living in Risch-Rotkreuz. The pair became romantically involved after a few dates, and Sprungk moved in to live with her for a short while.

On the night between June 23 and 24, 2007, Sprungk convinced Kämpf-Riberio to accompany him on a supposed trip to Mansfeld. Instead of going to the town, however, he drove to an isolated section of the Wolfsgrube forest, tied her to a tree and suffocated her with a plastic bag. After stealing her personal items and money, Sprungk buried Kämpf-Riberio's body nearby and left. She was reported missing by her ex-husband on that same day, and while Sprungk was considered the sole suspect in her disappearance, prosecutors were reluctant to press charges due to the fact that they were unable to find a body at the time.

Over the following year, Sprungk committed a litany of crimes for which he was convicted and sentenced to 2 years and 7 months of preventive detention. Fearing that the authorities were after him and wanting to gather funds to escape to Switzerland, he considered robbing a house in Mansfeld. On June 29, 2008, he broke into the house of 76-year-old Annemarie S. - upon seeing her, he attacked the elderly woman and strangled her with a shoelace. To his disappointment, there was little money or valuables in the home, prompting Sprungk to call in Annemarie's 64-year-old family doctor, Dr. Horst Grimm, under the pretense of her having some sort of medical emergency. When Grimm arrived, Sprungk strangled him and stole the car keys to his Mercedes-Benz.

== Arrest, trial, and imprisonment ==
=== First trial ===
After stealing the car, Sprungk used Annemarie's credit card to make at least two withdrawals from her account, which was immediately noticed by bank staff. This was reported to the local authorities, who then tracked him down to a beer garden in the Canton of Bern, where Sprungk was arrested by Swiss authorities.

Sprungk was eventually extradited back to Mansfeld, where he was now charged with the murders of Annemarie S. and Grimm. While he admitted that he was responsible, he claimed that the deaths were not pre-planned - in response, prosecutor Hendrik Weber and a court-appointed psychiatrist pointed out that the defendant exhibited perfect control during the commission of the acts and had no qualms about committing violent crimes. As a result, Sprungk was found guilty on all counts and given two life terms with preventive detention.

Kämpf-Riberio's case remained unsolved until February 2011, when forestry workers found skeletonized human remains and clothing items near Mansfeld. Suspecting that these probably belonged to a murder victim, the local prosecutor's office ordered that DNA be extracted and compared with any relevant missing persons cases. When it was confirmed that the body did indeed belong to Kämpf-Riberio, Sprungk was officially charged with her murder.

=== Second trial ===
When questioned, Sprungk gave several conflicting accounts about what had happened, mainly claiming that Kämpf-Riberio had accidentally fallen out of the car during an argument. Fearing that they would blame him for the murder, he then wrapped her body up in a carpet and threw it into the Rhine. This was dismissed by coroners and forensic specialists, who indicated that traces of plastic found wrapped around the victim's skull showed that she had been suffocated to death. He was found guilty of her murder and given another life term for it.

=== New charges and suicide ===
While incarcerated at JVA Burg Prison, Sprungk was allowed to use the facility's computer for a year as part of his therapy program. He claimed to spend most of his time writing stories about the Harz mountains and hiking with his dog, but in December 2017, a routine check of the device led to the discovery of videos containing child pornography.

Approximately a month later, Sprungk was found dead in his cell at JVA Burg Prison. The presence of a farewell note indicated that he had killed himself, but the exact method used was not disclosed to the public. His death was met with relief from a majority of the residents of Mansfeld, most of whom said they were happy he could never harm another human being ever again.

== See also ==
- List of German serial killers
