= Christa Lehmann =

German serial killer (born 1923)

- Born: Christa Ambros; 24 February 1923 (age 103); Worms, Germany
- Conviction: Murder
- Penalty: Life imprisonment; released after 23 years

Details
- Victims: 3
- Span of crimes: 1952–1954
- Country: West Germany

Christa Lehmann (née Ambros; born 24 February 1923) was a German serial killer.

== Early life ==
Lehmann was born Christa Ambros in Worms. Her mother suffered from mental illness and was institutionalized for most of her life in the Alzey psychiatric hospital during Christa's adolescence. The hospital participated in Aktion T4, the Nazi-era mass murder of psychiatric patients, but the fate of Christa's mother is unknown. Her father was an alcoholic and neglected her as a child.

== Murders ==
She married the tiler Karl Franz Lehmann in 1944, who died unexpectedly on 27 September 1952 within half an hour of suddenly suffering from violent convulsions. The doctor determined the cause of death as a perforated ulcer - it was well known that Karl was suffering from stomach problems. Before killing her husband, Christa tested the poison on her dachshund; she dissolved half a cup of the poison in its milk and gave it to drink. She told her neighbors that she killed the dog because she couldn’t afford the taxes. Christa’s laboratory experience taught her that animals have a greater resistance to poison than humans. On 14 October 1953, her father-in-law, Valentin Lehmann, died while riding his bicycle during a trip to the city. The doctor diagnosed the death as a heart attack.

The death of her husband however was caused by Christa mixing the poison Parathion, in Germany better known by the name E605, into his breakfast milk. The death of her father-in-law was caused by her mixing the same poison into his yogurt. As neither the body of the husband nor the father-in-law were forensically examined, both murders initially remained undetected.

Christa became friends with Annie Hamann, a war widow who lived with her mother Eva Ruh. The two young women went out together and also flirted with US soldiers. Eva, Annie's mother, did not regard Christa as a suitable companion for her daughter and also found the two deaths in Christa's family suspicious - so Christa decided to dispose of Eva in a similar way. On 14 February 1954, Christa came to visit, bringing chocolate pralines as gifts. Eva declined eating her praline and instead placed it in a cupboard.

The following day when Annie came home, she found the praline in the cupboard and bit into it. But the praline tasted bitter, so she spat it out. The family dog ate the remainder of the praline. Shortly after, Annie started suffering from convulsions and soon lost consciousness. When the doctor arrived, Annie was already dead - and so was the dog in the kitchen. After Eva described the events, the doctor informed the police.

== Conviction ==
Annie's body was brought to the forensic institute in Mainz. Lehmann was arrested and interrogated. On 23 February she confessed; that the poison had not been intended for Annie but for her mother. After an extensive investigation by Professor Kurt Wagner (amongst others for strychnine, arsenic and hydrogen cyanide), Lehmann's confession meant that he now knew what to look for and so he successfully tested Annie's stomach for E605. There had been no proven previous cases of murder or suicide using E605, but Wagner was able to develop a forensic test for this substance.

After the confirmation of Annie's death from E605, the bodies of Karl Franz and Valentin Lehmann were exhumed on 19 March. Both also showed signs of E605. On 20 September 1954, Lehmann's trial began. She was sentenced to three times life imprisonment. After 23 years in prison, she was released in 1977 and lived afterwards under a new identity.

== See also ==
- List of German serial killers

== Literature ==
- Jürgen Thorwald: The century of detectives. Path and adventure of criminalistics. Volume 3: Handbook for poisoners. Droemer Knaur, Munich u. a. 1968, (Several Editions).
- Stephan Harbort: The serial killer principle. What forces people to evil? Droste publishing house, Düsseldorf 2006, ISBN 3-7700-1221-6.
