= Willi Kimmritz =

Executed German serial killer

- Born: June 26, 1912; Wriezen, German Empire
- Died: 26 July 1950 (aged 38); Frankfurt an der Oder, East Germany
- Other name: The Horror of the Brandenburg Forest
- Status: Executed by guillotine
- Convictions: Murder (3 counts); Rape (13 counts)
- Penalty: Death

Details
- Victims: 4
- Span of crimes: 1946–1948
- Country: Soviet occupation zone in Germany
- Date apprehended: 11 September 1948

Willi Kimmritz (26 June 1912 – 26 July 1950), known as the Horror of the Brandenburg Forest (German: Der Schrecken der brandenburgischen Wälder), was a German serial killer, rapist and burglar who robbed and raped women in the forested areas surrounding Berlin from 1946 to 1948, killing four. He was convicted for 13 rapes and three of the murders, sentenced to death and executed in 1950.

== Biography ==
Kimmritz was born as the 14th child in a working-class family and attended Volksschule until the seventh grade. After his confirmation, he worked as a farmhand and a coachman in agriculture. His first conviction for rape took place in 1936, where he served three years in Gollnow prison. After his release, he married and had a child. In 1943, he robbed his employer, a wholesaler, and was again sentenced to three years in prison. During his detention, his wife divorced him.

In April 1945, Kimmritz and other prisoners in Gollnow were sent away to the West due to the approaching Red Army, where he was finally released. After an interlude as a steward of a supply of the Soviet occupiers, in which he was accused of embezzlement, he first fled to Bad Freienwalde to his mother and then to Berlin, where he lived without a permanent residence mostly around prostitutes. He made his living mainly through robbery and burglary.

Between 1946 and 1948 he lured several women to the Brandenburg forest areas north and east of Berlin, where he raped and robbed them, killing four. His actions triggered one of the largest post-war manhunt operations called Aktion Roland. The search for Kimmritz was initially unsuccessful for several years, although several of the surviving victims identified him early in a facial composite. This was mainly because of the post-war circumstances (insufficient police forces and investigators, obstruction of the search by the Soviet occupation authorities, jurisdictional disputes between the occupying powers and finally the Berlin Blockade), which made the investigation difficult.

On 11 September 1948, Kimmritz was recognised by Else Baethke, a friend of victim Frieda Imlau whom she last saw dining at a bakery in Wedding in the late summer of 1948. He was later arrested in the French sector, and confessed to the crimes in the subsequent interrogation. He was extradited to the Soviet sector, where he confessed to 45 rapes, 4 murders and numerous property offences. On 18 February 1949, the trial began in the district court of Potsdam. For procedural reasons, he was only tried for 13 rapes and 3 murders. On the same day, his death sentence was pronounced, which was confirmed in the appeal application. On 26 July 1950, Willi Kimmritz was guillotined in the detention centre of Frankfurt an der Oder.

== See also ==
- List of German serial killers
- List of serial rapists

== In the media ==
- The DEFA feature film Leichensache Zernik (1971) is about the hunt for Kimmritz.
- In 2014, a docudrama entitled Willi Kimmritz - The Forest Terror, directed by Gabi Schlag and Benno Wenz, was made for the series Tatort Berlin on Rundfunk Berlin-Brandenburg. They interviewed contemporary witnesses, reconstructed crime scenes and it was narrated by criminologist Stephan Harbort.

== Bibliography ==
- Aktion Roland - Jagd auf einen Frauenmörder [Aktion Roland - The Hunt for a Ladykiller] (in German). Berlin: Das Neue Berlin. 2001. ISBN 3-360-00870-7.
- Jan Eik (20 February 2013). Schaurige Geschichten aus Berlin: Die dunklen Geheimnisse der Stadt [Scary stories from Berlin: The dark secrets of the city] (in German). Jaron Verlag GmbH. ISBN 978-3955521820.
