= Sophie Ursinus =

German serial killer (1760–1836)

Sophie Charlotte Elisabeth Ursinus
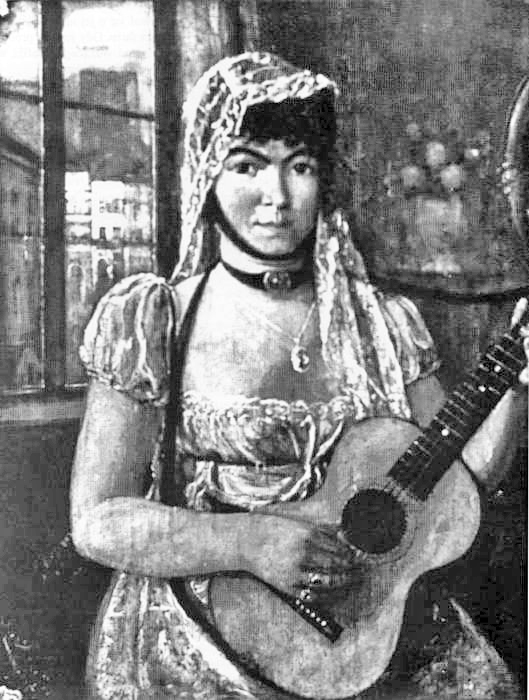
- Portrait of Charlotte Ursinus - until 1945 in the Museum of Glatz, now in a private collection
- Born: Sophie Weingarten; 5 May 1760; Glatz, Lower Silesia
- Died: 4 April 1836 (aged 75); Glatz, Lower Silesia
- Status: Deceased
- Convictions: Murder; Attempted murder
- Penalty: Life imprisonment

Details
- Victims: 3
- Span of crimes: September 1796 – 1803
- Country: Prussia
- Date apprehended: 1803

Sophie Charlotte Elisabeth Ursinus (née Weingarten; 5 May 1760 – 4 April 1836) was a German serial killer believed to have been responsible for poisoning her husband, aunt, and lover, and of attempting to poison her servant. Her trial led to a method of identifying arsenic poisoning.

== Early life ==
Sophie Weingarten was born in Glatz (now Kłodzko), a city in Lower Silesia, Prussia, the daughter of the secretary of the Austrian legation. Her father lost his position, so at the age of 19 she married the much older counsellor of the Supreme Court, Theodor Ursinus. She lived with him in Stendal until 1792 and afterwards in Berlin. Privy Counsellor Ursinus died there, suddenly, on 11 September 1800, a day after celebrating his birthday. His wife came under suspicion for not summoning a doctor after the medicine she administered to him made his condition worse.

During her marriage, Sophie started an affair with a Dutch officer named Rogay, possibly with the consent of her elderly husband. He left Berlin for a time but later returned and died three years before her husband. At the time, his death was attributed to tuberculosis. It was later discovered that shortly before his death Sophie Ursinus had purchased a quantity of arsenic.

On 24 January 1801 an aunt of Sophie Ursinus, Christiane Witte, died in Charlottenburg after a short illness, leaving her a large inheritance. It was again later discovered that Sophie Ursinus had purchased a large quantity of arsenic shortly before her aunt had died.

At the end of February 1803 Sophie Ursinus's servant, Benjamin Klein, became ill, after having quarrelled with her sometime earlier. She gave him an emetic, then soup, which made him worse. He became suspicious and when she gave him some plums, he secretly had them examined by a chemist, who confirmed that they contained arsenic.

== Autopsies and trial ==
Sophie Ursinus was arrested and soon came under suspicion of having poisoned her husband. His body was exhumed, but at the autopsy the examiners, the chemist Martin Heinrich Klaproth and his assistant, Valentin Rose, could not confirm that he had been poisoned with arsenic. But there was a suspicion, from the general condition of the bodily organs and convulsive contraction of the limbs, that arsenic had been used to poison him. She was next charged with murdering her aunt. Again, the body was exhumed but this time the examiners, contrary to what the doctors had said at her death, had no doubt that the aunt had died from arsenic poisoning and that Sophie Ursinus had administered the poison.

The trial for murder ended on 12 September 1803. In her attempt to save her life and honour, Sophie Ursinus disputed every point, but was found guilty of the murder of her aunt and the attempted murder of her servant, and was sentenced to life imprisonment. She was allowed a certain amount of comfort while in prison in Glatz; she was even allowed to have parties with guests and to dress in fine clothes. After 30 years, she was pardoned in 1833 and rejoined the upper-class society of Glatz until her death in 1836.

The work of Valentin Rose in proving that the victims in this case were actually poisoned showed that the evidence of doctors who were present at death was not sufficient. In 1836 the Marsh test, a highly sensitive method in the detection of arsenic, was developed by the chemist James Marsh.

== See also ==
- List of German serial killers
