= Marianne Nölle =

German serial killer

- Born: 1938; Cologne, Germany
- Died: 28 July 2022 (aged 83–84)
- Occupation: Nurse
- Years active: 1984–1992
- Criminal charges: Murder
- Penalty: Life imprisonment

Details
- Killed: 7 confirmed, 17 suspected
- Date apprehended: 1993

Marianne Nölle (1938 – 28 July 2022) was a German serial killer from Cologne. She was sentenced to life imprisonment in 1993 for seven murders.

== Crimes ==
Nölle was a nurse who between 1984 and 1992 killed patients in her care using Truxal. Police believe she killed a total of 17 and attempted 18 other murders, but she was convicted of only seven. She never confessed to her crimes. She died on 28 July 2022, at the age of 84.

== See also ==
- List of German serial killers
