= Irmgard Swinka =

German serial killer

- Born: Irmgard Kuschinski; 1912; Berlin, German Empire
- Died: October 1988 (aged 76); Aachen, North Rhine-Westphalia, West Germany
- Other names: Irmgard Swinka-Kuschinski; Irmgard "Irmchen" Moser
- Conviction: Murder (5 counts)
- Penalty: Death; commuted to life imprisonment

Details
- Victims: 5+
- Span of crimes: 1947–1948
- Country: Allied-occupied Germany
- States: Berlin, Hamburg, North Rhine-Westphalia, Hesse, Baden-Württemberg
- Date apprehended: July 1948

Irmgard Swinka (née Kuschinski, 1912 – October 1988) was a German serial killer who robbed and poisoned at least five elderly women between 1947 and 1948 with the help of two male accomplices. Convicted for these crimes, she became the last person to be sentenced to death in West Germany. Her death sentences were automatically commuted to life imprisonment following the abolition of the practice.

== Early life ==
Little is known about Swinka's early life. Born Irmgard Kuschinski in 1912 in Berlin, she grew up in an impoverished family where her alcoholic father beat both her and her siblings. She did not do well at school and was unable to learn a trade, and after graduating, she broke off all contact with her family.

As an adult Swinka worked as a waitress but was repeatedly imprisoned for theft, fraud, and embezzlement. Most of the charges stemmed from robbing or defrauding drunks and lesbians. She was also charged with bigamy after marrying to a third husband without divorcing her second, due to which the couple had to go into hiding from the Berlin authorities.

=== Black market transactions and purchase of poison ===
Following the Allied occupation, Swinka and her husband managed to live in fairly decent conditions due to their dealings on the black market – this included a variety of stolen goods ranging from coffee beans to clothes and jewelry. Around July 1947, she obtained a supply of medication from a former paramedic for the SS she met at a refugee camp.

Using this, she embarked on a crime spree that consisted of drugging people in various cities across West Germany, mostly targeting single elderly women. She carried out these crimes with two male accomplices, Wilhelm Schmikahle and Ernst Himpel, who helped her during the robberies.

== Murders ==
Swinka's modus operandi consisted of pretending to be a Good Samaritan to her chosen victims she met on the train, park benches, or restaurants, earning their trust and invitation to their residence. Once there, she would offer them tea, coffee, or cigarettes that were secretly laced with morphine or Noctal sleeping pills. After the victim was either knocked out or dead, she would rob the premises of valuables while either Schmikahle or Himpel stood guard outside. When the goods were sold later on, Swinka often attempted to barter for Chesterfield-brand cigarettes, as they were her favorite.

While it is unclear what the actual number of victims is, it is assumed that she drugged at least 40 people non-fatally, while at least five died. The trio's area of operations spanned all three of the Allied occupation zones, as Swinka and her cohorts were known to have targeted people in Berlin, Hamburg, Essen, Frankfurt, Heidelberg and Cologne. In at least one case, Swinka forced one victim, Minna S., to write a bogus suicide note before her apartment was robbed. Minna survived her ordeal, and later gave a witness statement that would become crucial in her assailant's arrest.

Her last confirmed victim was 63-year-old knitter Helene Schmitz, a resident of Cologne who was found dead on 23 June 1948 after drinking a "vitamin drink". Swinka had stolen a knitted vest, a few balls of wool and ration cards.

== Arrest ==
Initially, Schmitz's death was believed to be the result of a stroke and a death certificate identified it as such. However, inspector Erwin Kühn started interrogating the neighbors, from whom he learned that Schmitz had been visited by a "conspicuous elegant visitor" that matched the description of similar cases in other parts of the country. He then examined the elderly woman's body and found blisters on her feet, an indication that she had indeed been poisoned. Using Minna S.'s witness statement, investigators searched through their archives and found a mugshot of Swinka from a previous arrest, which they distributed for publication in newspapers across the nation.

Swinka was soon put on a wanted list, leading to her arrest on a train near Hamm in July 1948, after a woman reported her for resembling the fugitive shown in the newspaper. When the detectives approached her, Swinka was tending to her little dog, Texas, prompting one of them to ask the woman by name if the dog was alright and handing her a cigarette.

== Trial and aftermath ==
While in custody at the Klingelpütz Prison, Swinka claimed to have devoted herself to Satan, who she described as a "boney man with a wobbly head". Her outbursts were not taken seriously, as investigators considered these shoddy attempts to feign insanity. During her detention, Swinka spent time reading the works of Friedrich Lienhard and, due to nicotine withdrawal, she ate so much food that she gained 20 kilograms in weight. Her lawyer later used this as an example of her client's remorseless and callous behavior towards her victims.

Swinka's trial began on 21 April 1949 before a jury court in Cologne, with the prosecutors aiming to have her convicted of seven counts of murder. In total, 235 witnesses and 40 expert witnesses were heard during the process. The trial was noted for several inexplicable occurrences, such as the stomach contents of a victim disappearing while being transferred from one institute to another, and another occasion in which a lab employee accidentally burned the heart and liver of an exhumed victim. At the trial itself, Swinka attempted to portray herself as insane, but her attempts were rebuked by Professor Victor Müller-Heß, who pointed out that her behavior was not consistent with that of someone who was actually mentally unwell.

On 7 May 1949, the court found Swinka guilty on five counts of murder and sentenced her to death on four of them, in addition to handing a life sentence plus 15 years imprisonment, preventive detention and lifelong loss of civil rights. When the verdict was announced, Swinka remained composed and seemingly resigned to her fate.

The death sentences were automatically commuted to life imprisonment a little more than two weeks later, on 23 May, as a newly enacted law abolished the practice in West Germany. It is unclear if Wilhelm Schmikahle and Ernst Himpel stood trial for their roles in the crimes, and if they did, what happened to them afterward.

After her conviction, Swinka served her life sentence for approximately 38 years, spending most of her time in her jail cell tending to her two budgies, Buki and Mekki. Even though she was allowed on parole on multiple occasions, any appeals for clemency were denied out of fear that she would re-offend.

This all changed in 1987 when Swinka was pardoned by Johannes Rau, the contemporary Minister-President of North Rhine-Westphalia. She was moved into a retirement home in Aachen under the assumed name of Irmgard "Irmchen" Moser, where she died of a heart attack a year later in October 1988, with her true identity only known by the home's director.

== In the media and culture ==
The Swinka case was covered in the book "Chicago am Rhein" by author Bernd Imgrund, who detailed fascinating criminal cases that occurred in Cologne.

The Swinka case was covered on the podcast True Crime Cologne (German: True Crime Köln) in 2023, with the guest – retired judge Norbert Klein – retelling the story of Swinka, her lawyer Elsbeth van Ameln and the outcome of the trial itself.

== See also ==
- List of German serial killers
- Capital punishment in Germany

== Bibliography ==
- Yvonne Hötzel (2010). Debatten um die Todesstrafe in der Bundesrepublik Deutschland von 1949 bis 1990 [Debates about the death penalty in the Federal Republic of Germany from 1949 to 1990] (in German). De Gruyter. p. 22. ISBN 978-3-11-024876-0.
