= Irene Becker =

German nurse and serial killer (born 1952)

- Born: 1952 (age 73–74); Hermsdorf, Berlin, East Germany
- Other names: "Sister Death" "The Angel of Death from Charité"
- Conviction: Murder
- Penalty: Life imprisonment

Details
- Victims: 5–8
- Span of crimes: 2005–2006
- Country: Germany
- State: Berlin

Irene Becker (born 1952) is a German nurse, and serial killer, who killed at least 5 people by administering them drugs while working at the Charité clinic. In the media, she was given nicknames like the Angel of Death from Charité and Sister Death.

Becker, who was considered a dutiful nurse, had previously worked as a nurse in an intensive care unit for 35 years.

Her deeds were discovered after a fellow nurse found a discarded ampoule in the hospital garbage, subsequently informing the management of her suspicions about the exceptionally high death rate in the ward.

Becker was sentenced on 29 June 2007 by the Landgericht Berlin for murder in five out of eight cases, and given life imprisonment. The court considered that the murderous trait of the other base motives was fulfilment and considered that the nurse became obsessed with power while murdering the patients.

On appeal from the defence, the Federal Court of Justice changed the guilty verdict to triple homicide and two counts of manslaughter, but that did not change the sentence.

A particular severity of guilt was not established. Thus, the remainder of the sentence can be suspended after serving 15 years (counting from her arrest in October 2006), i.e. from late 2021 onwards.

== See also ==
- List of German serial killers
