= Elisabeth Wiese =

German serial killer

- Born: 1 July 1853; Bilshausen, Kingdom of Hanover
- Died: 2 February 1905 (aged 51); Hamburg, German Empire
- Other name: "The angel-maker of St. Pauli"
- Status: Executed by guillotine
- Convictions: Murder (5 counts); Fraud
- Penalty: Death

Details
- Victims: 5
- Span of crimes: 1902–1903
- Date apprehended: 1903

Elisabeth Wiese (1 July 1853 – 2 February 1905) was a German serial killer from Hamburg, convicted and executed for the killing of five children.

== Early life ==
As a young woman, she worked as a midwife. She already had a daughter, Paula, when she married the tradesman Heinrich Wiese. After being convicted of carrying out illegal abortions she was prevented from carrying out her profession, and money grew scarce. Tensions grew between herself and her husband. She tried to murder him on several occasions, firstly by poisoning his food and then by attempting to cut his throat with a razor while he slept. She was not successful and was sent to prison after being convicted of several crimes.

== Murders ==
Upon release from prison, she offered her services as a child-carer to women who could not raise their children themselves, or who had illegitimate children. Initially, she charged the mothers a one-time fee for handing the children over to adoptive parents, who in turn had to be paid. However, she did not always pay the adoptive parents, who returned the children to her, so they had to be gotten rid of. She then informed the mothers of babies left in her care that she had had the babies adopted by rich families in distant countries. What she actually did was poison the babies with morphine and burn their bodies in a stove in her apartment. However, suspicions grew about the fate of these babies and investigations began.

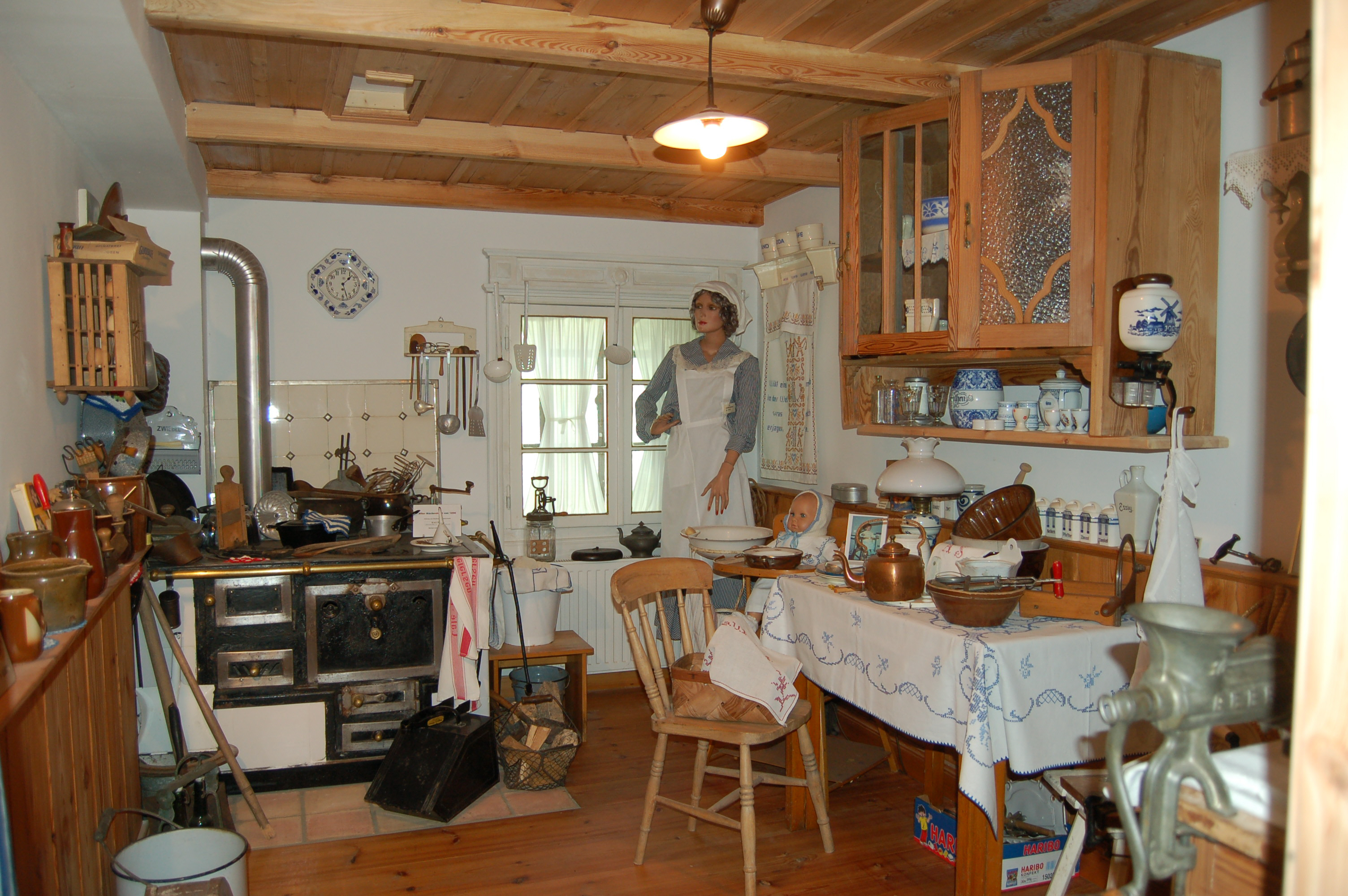
The kitchen in the Uetersen Museum where part of Wiese's life was filmed

As she had to distance herself from dealing with babies, Wiese forced her daughter Paula into prostitution. Paula fled to London, but became pregnant. She returned to Hamburg and gave birth in a cellar. Immediately after the birth Wiese drowned Paula's baby and burnt the body in the stove. When the police started investigating the case they searched Wiese's apartment and discovered her cache of morphine and poisons. As she lived in St. Pauli, a suburb of Hamburg, she became known as "the angel-maker of St. Pauli".

On 10 October 1904 Wiese was convicted in court of fraud, living off immoral earnings and the murder of five children. She was executed by guillotine in 1905. ce

== See also ==
- List of German serial killers

== Media ==
In March 2010 the story of Elisabeth Wiese was filmed by NDR in Germany.

== Bibliography ==
- Hugo Friedländer: Ein entmenschtes Weib. Die Engelmacherin Wiese. (Friedländer: Kriminalprozesse, p. 250) ISBN 3-89853-151-1
- Michael Kirchschlager (Hrsg.): Historische Serienmörder. Menschliche Ungeheuer vom späten Mittelalter bis zum Ende des 19. Jahrhunderts. 2007 ISBN 978-3-934277-13-7
- Das freie Wort: Frankfurter Halbmonatsschrift für Fortschritt auf allen Gebieten des geistigen Lebens, vol. 7. Neuer Frankfurter Verlag, 1908, p. 194
- Baby Farmer must die. – Notorious German Woman Receives Five Capital Sentences. Syndicated (Bulletin Press Association), Oshkosh Daily Northwestern, Wisconsin (USA), 1 November 1904, p. 4
- Zeitschrift für experimentelle Pathologie und Therapie, vol. 2, A. Hirschwald 1906, p. 495
- Zeitschrift für Kinderforschung mit besonderer Berücksichtigung der pädagogischen Pathologie, vol. 17, edited by Johannes Trüper together with Dr. G. Anton, Dr. med. Martinak, Chr. Ufer, Dr. Karl Wilker, Langensalza 1908, p. 171
