= Anna Maria Zwanziger =

German serial killer (1760–1811)

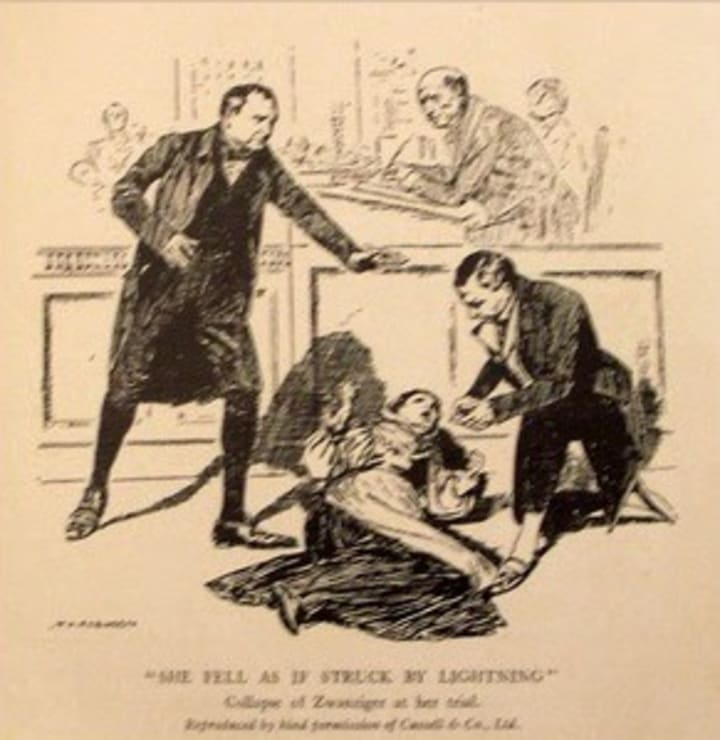
- Zwanziger passed out
- Born: Anna Margaretha Zwanziger; 7 August 1760; Nuremberg, Holy Roman Empire
- Died: 17 September 1811 (aged 51); Kulmbach
- Cause of death: Execution by beheading
- Conviction: Murder
- Penalty: Death

Details
- Victims: 4
- Span of crimes: 1801–1811
- Country: Germany

Anna Margaretha Zwanziger (7 August 1760 – 17 September 1811) was a German serial killer. She used arsenic, which she referred to as "her truest friend".

From 1801 to 1811, Zwanziger was employed as a housekeeper at the home of several judges in Germany. She would poison her employers with arsenic, and then nurse them back to health to gain their favour. She poisoned three people and attempted to poison several others. She killed four people, one of whom was a baby.

Zwanziger was judged guilty of murder and sentenced to death. Before she was beheaded, she said it was probably a good thing she was to be executed, as she did not think she would be able to stop.

Wilkie Collins referenced her in his 1880 thriller Jezebel's Daughter.

== See also ==
- List of German serial killers
