= Mario Stiebitz =

German serial killer

- Born: 1962; East Berlin, East Germany
- Died: 7 December 2024 (aged 61–62)
- Convictions: Murder x5 Attempted murder
- Penalty: Life imprisonment

Details
- Victims: 5
- Span of crimes: 1983–1984
- Country: East Germany
- States: Mecklenburg-Vorpommern, Brandenburg
- Date apprehended: 8 July 1984

Mario Stiebitz (1962 – 7 December 2024) was a German serial killer who murdered four children and one man in Neubrandenburg and near East Berlin from 1983 to 1984. He was convicted of these crimes and sentenced to life imprisonment.

== Early life ==
Little is known about Stiebitz's early life. He was born in 1962 and grew up in the East Berlin neighborhood of Lichtenberg. He lived with his grandmother until the age of six, when he was brought to his mother's house, who had since remarried. Stiebitz did not get along with his stepfather, as he considered himself neglected in comparison to his younger brother and was unjustly punished for things he did not do.

At school, he was considered an outcast by his peers but was nonetheless a high-achieving student. Since his teenage years, he realized that he was attracted to boys and young men, and that he felt excitement by applying pressure to his stomach.

After graduation, he completed an apprenticeship as an electrician and worked at a civil engineering company where he was noted for his work ethic. He then did his basic military service with the National People's Army, but later applied for an extension and eventually reached the rank of feldwebel. Upon completing his training as a teleprinter and cipher in Neubrandenburg, he was transferred to an Air Force base in Cölpin. Stiebitz spent most of his free time away from other soldiers and frequently travelled alone to Neubrandenburg and Berlin, even moving into an apartment in Prenzlauer Berg in August 1983.

Aside from his hobbies of photography, collecting stamps and reading utopian novels and crime books, Stiebitz also spent a lot of his time daydreaming about fondling naked boys and choking them. He eventually decided to act out on his desires, for which he bought a knife which he would use in the murders that followed.

== Murders ==
Stiebitz committed his first murder on 16 July 1983, when he ambushed 22-year-old Jörg D. sitting on a park bench in Neubrandenburg and stabbed him to death. The man had fallen asleep there drunk after visiting a pub. He then hid the victim's body in a bush near a forest, where it was discovered by passers-by on 1 August. Stiebitz had unknowingly left behind a distinctive black and purple ballpoint pen at the crime scene, which was found next to the victim's body.

Seemingly dissatisfied with his first murder, Stiebitz decided to exclusively target children, as he considered them easier to abuse. On 26 July, he came across a 9-year-old schoolboy who had gone swimming at a lake. After making sure there were no witnesses around, Stiebitz accosted him and pulled him into a nearby bush, where he forced the child to reveal all of his personal information, which he wrote down in a notebook he was carrying on him. Stiebitz then proceeded to take explicit photographs and abuse the boy before eventually stabbing him to death.

On 9 August, 23-year-old Karl-Heinz D., an alcoholic and known hooligan from Neubrandenburg, was arrested for these two murders at the beginning of August. He had gotten into a physical altercation with the adult victim Jörg D. on the day he had been murdered, with his blood type supposedly matching that found on the victim's jacket - in addition, he was seen in a drunken state in the vicinity of the lake on the same day when the 9-year-old schoolboy was murdered. Karl-Heinz D. finally confessed to the two murders on 7 August, partly due to his alcohol-induced amnesia, and was sentenced to life imprisonment a few months later. He remained in prison for a year, until his innocence was definitively proven and he was released.

On the night of 3 September, Stiebitz was roaming around Strasburg in search of a victim when he noticed a young man drunkenly staggering into his house. Using a nearby ladder, he climbed into the man's bedroom through an open window and attacked him, but the victim started screaming, waking up his parents in the process. Stiebitz then fled, ditching his knife. The victim filed a report to the police, but as he was drunk at the time of the attack, he was unable to give a more precise description of his assailant. In the meantime, Stiebitz bought another knife at a marketplace in Alexanderplatz.

On 23 September, Stiebitz left the barracks without permission and took a train to Oranienburg in search of victims. After failing to find any, he went to Borgsdorf, where he finally came across two brothers (9 and 11, respectively) picking mushrooms in a forest. He asked them about the time and had some small talk with the pair before grabbing and tying them up, after which he did his routine of photographing, abusing, and ultimately stabbing them to death. He then took the train back to his apartment in Berlin, throwing the murder weapon into a dumpster along the way. Stiebitz then recorded the events in his notebook and placed a pocket knife stolen from one of the boys into an envelope labelled "005".

Over the following months, he constantly searched for a suitable victim but was unable to find any. On 7 February 1984, Stiebitz drove to Neubrandenburg and wandered around the city until he came across a 6-year-old boy who just got out of his father's car to go to a department store in Datzeberg. Utilizing this opportunity, he accosted the boy and dragged him to the basement of a nearby house, where he abused and suffocated him.

== Arrest and conviction ==
For a long time, the General Prosecutor's Office struggled to locate any evidence that could lead to an arrest in any of the cases. National People's Army personnel were also investigated, but as they checked the conscripts only, Stiebitz was not among those who were interrogated.

In June 1984, Stiebitz was at a pit lake near Schildow, north of East Berlin, where he accosted a 9-year-old boy. However, he let the boy go after other children, including the boy's older brother, came to his rescue. Fearing that they would identify him, Stiebitz rode out to the town again on 8 July, looking to locate the child he had accosted two weeks prior. After hiding by the lake for some time, he noticed the 12-year-old brother of his initial victim riding a bicycle, along with another boy of about the same age.

Stiebitz got into their path intent on luring them to the bushes, but the boy instantly recognized him as his brother's assailant, after which both he and his friend escaped to their parents' weekend homes to tell them what happened. The boys' fathers then hurried to the lake with several friends in search of Stiebitz, whom they eventually found hiding in some bushes. They then grabbed and dragged him to the nearest police station.

He remained in custody for a few days, after which he made a written confession in which he confessed to the five murders. While inspecting his apartment in East Berlin, investigators found a book titled Secret Private Matters (German: Geheime Privatsache), where all the murders were written down in great detail. In addition to this, there were gauze bandages and tape with which he gagged his victims and a camera with which he photographed them.

On 19 November 1985, Stiebitz was convicted by the Berlin Military High Court in a secret trial on five counts of murder, one count of attempted murder and 20 counts of planning a murder. He was subsequently sentenced to life imprisonment and transferred to a prison in Bautzen.

In November 2013, the Berlin Public Prosecutor General's Office rejected a petition for early released submitted by Stiebitz. When the same public prosecutor's office came to the conclusion that his state of health made it unlikely that he would endanger people, the execution of his life sentence was suspended on April 4, 2024, after almost forty years. He died on December 7, 2024, in a hospital.

== See also ==
- List of German serial killers

== Sources ==
=== Literature ===
- Hans Girod: Das Ekel von Rahnsdorf und andere Mordfälle aus der DDR, Berlin 1997, ISBN 3-359-00872-3 (German)
