= Klaus Gosmann =

Convicted German serial killer (born 1940)

- Born: 1 September 1940; Frankfurt an der Oder, Nazi Germany
- Other name: "The Midday Murderer"
- Motive: Robbery
- Conviction: Murder
- Penalty: Life imprisonment

Details
- Victims: 7
- Span of crimes: 1960–1965
- Country: West Germany
- State: Bavaria

Klaus Gosmann (born 1 September 1940), nicknamed The Midday Murderer, is a German serial killer who killed 7 people. He received his nickname because he committed his robberies and murders mostly at noon. He was released in 2015 after 50 years in prison, being up until that point Bavaria's longest-serving prisoner.

== Life ==
Gosmann was born in 1940, the son of an officer who was killed by American troops in February 1945. He grew up with his brother until 1945 in Meseritz in eastern Brandenburg and from 1949 in Hersbruck. After five years in elementary school, Gosmann moved to the Oberrealschule Hersbruck in 1951. There he had to repeat a class and failed his matriculation exam. He moved to a secondary school in Ingolstadt and graduated there in July 1962. In the fall of the same year, he began studying economics at the Technische Hochschule Nürnberg, but he discontinued his education.

In the summer of 1964, he volunteered as a candidate officer and moved in October. After training with various pioneer units in Koblenz and Munich, he repeatedly sought his dismissal. When this failed, he deserted in April 1965 and henceforth lived under false names in and around Nuremberg.

== Crimes ==
Gosmann shot two women and five men during his robberies in Nuremberg between 1960 and 1965. Striking was the fact that the perpetrator made use of the firearm immediately and his actions always occurred at noon.

The first murder occurred on 22 April 1960 in the Tuchergartenstraße in Nuremberg, when Gosmann raided an elderly woman's apartment. When she called for help, a subtenant and her fiancé hurried to her, who were then both shot dead by the burglar. Gosmann fled without loot and left the householder alive. She alarmed the police, and the woman gave them a good description of the perpetrator. Despite the alarm of all Nuremberg police stations and the surrounding areas, the fugitive could not be caught. The officials followed up hundreds of clues from the population and sighted with the householder about 2000 photos from the criminal files. In addition, fingerprints were compared, connections to similar robberies were sought and dozens of comparisons were carried out. Finally, an FN Herstal calibre 7.65mm was identified as the murder weapon.

After about a year without success, the investigators launched one of the largest manhunt operations in the history of the Federal Republic. All men born in 1939 or 1940, who had lived in Nuremberg at the time of the crime, were examined, a total of 50,336 people. The officers also questioned 1,174 men from the dating agency where the surviving homeowner worked.

On 10 September 1962, the next murder took place. Gosmann shot the store manager of the Sparkasse in Ochenbruck and escaped with over 3,000 Deutsche Mark in loot, this time using a Walther PPK pistol. Witnesses could follow his escape route to the station. As early as 30 November, Gosmann attacked the Sparkasse branch office in Neuhaus an der Pegnitz and shot dead a retiree, who did not seem aware of the robbery and had reached into his breast pocket to get a pair of glasses. As a weapon this time a Walther P38 was used.

While the officials were still busy with the investigation of previous crimes, the owner of a gun shop and his mother were shot on 29 March 1963. The projectiles, pods and individual firing features identified the same Walther pistols as used in the deadly shootings in Ochenbruck and Neuhaus. The male murder victim was under investigation for possible illegal arms deals.

On 1 June 1965, Gosmann committed his last crime in a Nuremberg department store. After trying to steal a customer's purse, several passers-by pursued him. Policemen arrested Gosmann after a shoot-out in which he killed one man and severely injured two others.

== Trial and imprisonment ==
At the time of his arrest, Gosmann had three pistols, a blackjack and firecrackers with him. He initially denied the crimes, but one of his pistols and two others, which were in a tenanted apartment in Nuremberg, could be identified as murder weapons. These had been looted during thefts in 1959, 1960 and 1962. When confronted, a witness of the Ochenbruck raid recognized him.

Confronted with this evidence, he confessed, revealing his indifference to the victims. Among other things, he said this to authorities: "He came rushing at me like a savage (...) Since I absolutely wanted to ward off his attack, I therefore fired a third time on the man" (first murder in Nuremberg), "When I walked into the savings bank and drew my gun, they all had to put their paws up. If they didn’t, it was their own fault if I had to shoot them." (for the bank robberies) "I was afraid that I would be captured, and yet had to shoot in self-defense". (last murder in Nuremberg)

The secret of the Midday crimes was also solved - Gosmann was not an early riser and needed the morning for his preparations.

On 27 July 1967, Gosmann was sentenced to life imprisonment for fivefold murder and three particularly serious cases of robbery. The first double murder was not negotiated because he had committed it before his 21st birthday.

At the beginning of 2010, the district court of Regensburg ordered the release Gosmann on a long-term parole. However, this decision was overturned by the Higher Regional Court of Nuremberg, as there was still a danger that Gosmann would commit serious crimes. The Verfassungsbeschwerde against this was successful in 2012. After the Federal Constitutional Court's decision, he was now prepared for life outside of prison and on 26 February 2015, Gosmann was released from the Straubing Prison on probation after spending 50 years in prison.

== See also ==
- List of German serial killers

== General and cited references ==
- Tobias Haberl: "Seven deaths and one life". Süddeutsche Zeitung. 21 October 2017, online at 12app.ch on 31 October 2017.
- Stephan Harbort: The Midday Murderer. Audiobook series Phenomenon of a serial killer. Pablos Media, Cologne 2007, ISBN 3-938852-57-7.
- Felix Hutt: 7 murders, 50 years imprisonment, 1 life after that: The "Midday Murderer" Klaus Gosmann – The true story of a serial sinner. Heyne, Munich 2017, ISBN 978-3-453-20149-1.
- Mauz, Gerhard (17 July 1967). "What happened, for heaven's sake??". Der Spiegel. No. 30. pp. 51 f.
- Petra Nacke, Elmar Tannert: The Midday Murderer. Ars Vivendi Verlag, Cadolzburg 2012, ISBN 978-3-86913-109-2.
