= Franz Josef Ludy =

German serial killer and child rapist (born 1933)

- Born: 1933 (age 92–93); Hamburg, Germany
- Convictions: Murder, Child sexual abuse
- Penalty: Life imprisonment

Details
- Victims: 4
- Span of crimes: 1952–1968
- Country: West Germany
- State: Hamburg
- Date apprehended: 20 February 1968

Franz Josef Ludy (born 1933) is a German serial killer who killed four people between 1952 and 1968, and was later sentenced to life imprisonment plus 15 years a total of 3 times. The Bild has described him as "one of the greatest lust killers in German criminal history". Although later convicted of murder, he has tried to stop the tabloids from calling him a killer.

== Early life ==
Ludy was born as the only son of a joiner, who had eight daughters. At age 15, he tumbled trying to jump on a moving tram. He got back up, but fell unconscious seconds later. After this, he entered the life of crime for the first time: due to stealing radio lottery tickets worth 32,00 Deutsche Mark, he lost his job at the Deutsche Bundespost, within which he had delivered amounts up to 30,000 Deutsche Mark. The first and only relationship Ludy had with a girl was called off by his mother, and until his conviction, he never had a relationship with a woman again. In the following years, he left the family home and travelled around southern East Germany, Switzerland and Belgium, living partially under a false name. During this time, while in a train station toilet in Hamburg, he attempted suicide by overdosing on sleeping pills.

== Murders ==
At 19, he killed a 12-year-old boy, but was sentenced to only 8 years imprisonment due to being considered an adolescent. The weapon used in the murder was a pitchfork. Following his early release, Ludy attempted numerous sex crimes and murders aimed at children.

In 1956, he hit a 13-year-old boy on the head. Although the victim's brain protruded due to the blow, the child survived, with lasting damage.

On 18 September 1961, he shot at a 7-year-old boy he had abducted in Rottweil, choked him, and then pushed him out of the car. The child survived. Ten days later, he shot and killed a 57-year-old man and his 37-year-old girlfriend in the Schwetzinger State Forest using a gun that he always carried with him.

Subsequently, Ludy proceeded to perform many sexual offences, abductions, and murder attempts. Among others, while in Hamburg in November 1964, he molested a 9-year-old girl.

The last victim of Ludy was a 7-year-old boy, whom he initially abducted and sexually abused before killing him on 16 February 1968. After the body was discovered, the boy's killer was arrested only four days later.

== Trial ==
The investigation, acting upon Ludy's confessions, revealed that he had suffered from a traumatic brain injury following the 1948 accident. He himself said before the assizes: "Since the accident, everything went wrong with me". He also stated that he could only remember fragments of his actions. The court therefore considered the insanity defence, because of Ludy's mental incompetence. However, he was still convicted of murder in three cases, three cases of attempted murder and four cases of child sexual abuse coinciding with deprivation of liberty. The evidence gathered during the investigations disclosed that Ludy had sought sexual contact with at least a hundred boys. The first and foremost defence by the auditors, the insanity defence, was unsuccessful. Similarly, a preliminary injunction aimed at the Axel Springer SE fell through, as Ludy was described by the Bild as "one of the biggest sex killers in German criminal history".

== See also ==
- List of German serial killers

== Literature ==
- Peter Murakami, Julia Murakami: Lexikon der Serienmörder. 450 Fallstudien einer pathologischen Tötungsart; München: Ullstein, 2001; ISBN 3-548-35935-3
- Dieter Sinn: Das große Verbrecherlexikon.; Herrsching: Pawlak, 1984; ISBN 3-88199-146-8
