= Kurt-Friedhelm Steinwegs =

Convicted German serial killer

- Born: 5 December 1960 (age 65); Viersen, North Rhine-Westphalia, West Germany
- Other name: "The Monster from Lower Rhine"
- Conviction: Murder
- Penalty: Committed to a psychiatric institution

Details
- Victims: 6
- Span of crimes: 1974–1983
- Country: West Germany
- State: Lower Saxony
- Date apprehended: 1984

Kurt-Friedhelm Steinwegs (born 5 December 1960), nicknamed The Monster from Lower Rhine, is a German serial killer who murdered six people between 1974 and 1983.

== Childhood ==
Kurt-Friedhelm Steinwegs was born as the fifth of eight children of a casual worker and his wife. The mother died in 1970 at the age of only 35 years. After his father looked after the children alone for two years, he invited a female friend to look after the children with him, both living in a marriage-like relationship.

The youngest brother was given up for adoption, two brothers were housed in children's homes, and another became a criminal and was detained for it.

== Home accommodation ==
In November 1974, Steinwegs was housed in a youth centre in Gifhorn, Lower Saxony. During this time he killed 59-year-old Ernst Dorf with a stone, but this was not revealed until years later.

In April 1976, the institution saw no further funding opportunities and requested a transfer for the boy. Eventually, in October 1976 he was housed in a curative education facility in Burglengenfeld, Bavaria. In July 1977, he was released and returned to live with his father in Willich.

== Murder of Andrew Robinson ==
While living with his father, he murdered 13-year-old Willich resident Andrew Robinson in 1978. In the broadcast of Aktenzeichen XY… ungelöst, the case was reported on 1 June 1979, but no evidence was determined to allow the authorities to track down the perpetrator. Steinwegs was not suspected of the crime.

== Arrest and trial ==
A little while later, Steinwegs was admitted to the Psychiatric State Hospital in Viersen. During this time, according to later revelations, he killed another four people, including a fellow patient. Among other things, he separated the genitalia from his victims' bodies.

Only in 1984, the police arrested Steinwegs after he had committed another murder. In the interrogations, he freely confessed to six homicides. At the trial, however, he recanted his confessions. He was later called a "beast" and nicknamed "The Monster from Lower Rhine" by the tabloids due to the brutality of his crimes.

Kurt-Friedhelm Steinwegs was sentenced in 1985 by the district court of Mönchengladbach to years of juvenile detention with subsequent preventative detention in a psychiatric institution. He was acquitted in two cases because he was considered not at fault at the time due to "intellectual development errors". To this day, he remains imprisoned in the forensic clinic in Bedburg-Hau.

== See also ==
- List of German serial killers
