= Jürgen Bartsch =

West German serial killer

- Born: Karl-Heinz Sadrozinski; 6 November 1946; Essen, Allied-occupied Germany
- Died: 28 April 1976 (aged 29); Eickelborn, West Germany
- Cause of death: Accidental halothane overdose
- Other name: The Carnival Killer (Der Kirmesmörder)
- Motive: Sexual sadism
- Conviction: Murder
- Penalty: Life imprisonment; commuted 10 years of juvenile detention

Details
- Victims: 4
- Span of crimes: 31 March 1962 – 6 May 1966
- Country: West Germany
- State: North Rhine-Westphalia
- Date apprehended: 1966

Jürgen Bartsch (born Karl-Heinz Sadrozinski; 6 November 1946 – 28 April 1976) was a West German serial killer and sex offender who murdered four boys aged between 8 and 13 and attempted to kill a fifteen-year-old boy. His conviction was the first in German history to include the psycho-social background of the defendant, who grew up in a violent environment, to set down the sentence.

== Early life ==
Bartsch was born out of wedlock. His mother died of tuberculosis five months later, and he spent the first months of his life under the care of nurses. At 11 months, he was adopted by a butcher and his wife in Langenberg (today Velbert-Langenberg), who named him Jürgen Bartsch. Bartsch's adoptive mother, who suffered from obsessive-compulsive disorder, was fixated on cleanliness. He was not permitted to play with other children, lest he become dirty. This continued into adulthood; his mother personally bathed him until he was 19. At age 10, Bartsch entered school. Because, in his parents' opinion, it was not sufficiently strict, he was moved to a Catholic boarding school.

Bartsch was physically abused as a baby and often had visible scars and bruises. His mother also physically beat him, often in the same room where his father, a butcher, carved slaughtered animals. He was detained in an underground cellar for six years and was also abused by his mother during bathing sessions. Bartsch was also sexually abused by his thirteen-year-old cousin when he was eight years old and by his teacher when he was thirteen years old.

== Murders ==
Bartsch began killing at the age of fifteen. His first victim was Klaus Jung, whom he murdered in 1962. His next victim was Peter Fuchs, in 1965. He persuaded his victims to accompany him into an abandoned air-raid shelter, where he forced them to undress and then sexually abused them. He dismembered his first four victims. His intended fifth victim, 14-year-old Peter Frese, escaped by burning through his bindings with a candle that Bartsch had left burning after leaving the shelter where he had been keeping his victims. Bartsch was arrested in 1966.

== Sentence ==
Upon arrest, Bartsch openly confessed. He was sentenced to life imprisonment on 15 December 1967, by the Wuppertal regional court (Landgericht Wuppertal). Initially, the sentence was upheld on appeal. However, in 1971, the Federal Court of Justice of Germany returned the case to the Landgericht Düsseldorf, which reduced the sentence to 10 years of juvenile detention and placed Bartsch under psychiatric care in Eickelborn. There, he married Gisela Deike of Hanover on 2 January 1974.

== Death ==
The forensic psychiatrists on his case considered various therapy concepts: psychotherapy, castration and even psychosurgery. Bartsch initially refused any surgery but finally agreed to voluntary castration on 28 April 1976, in order to avoid lifetime incarceration in a mental hospital. This was about ten years after his incarceration, two years after his marriage, and after his depressive condition did not improve. The doctors of Eickelborn State Hospital chose a castration methodology that accidentally killed him. An official autopsy and investigation determined that Bartsch had been intoxicated with a halothane overdose (factor 10) due to a mistake during surgery.

== Victims ==
- 31 March 1962: Klaus Jung, 8
- 6 August 1965: Peter Fuchs, 13
- 14 August 1965: Ulrich Kahlweiss, 12
- 6 May 1966: Manfred Grassmann, 12
- 18 June 1966: Peter Frese, 15 (escaped)

== Influence ==
The 2002 film Ein Leben lang kurze Hosen tragen (released in the U.S. in 2004 as The Child I Never Was) depicts Bartsch's life and crimes.

Bartsch is referenced in Elfriede Jelinek's novel Die Kinder der Toten as someone who had no difficulty dismembering his victims.

German metal band Bethlehem, whose bass player is also named Jürgen Bartsch, dedicated their album Hexakosioihexekontahexaphobia to Bartsch.

== See also ==
- Anísio Ferreira de Sousa
- List of German serial killers
