= Jasper Hanebuth =

German criminal

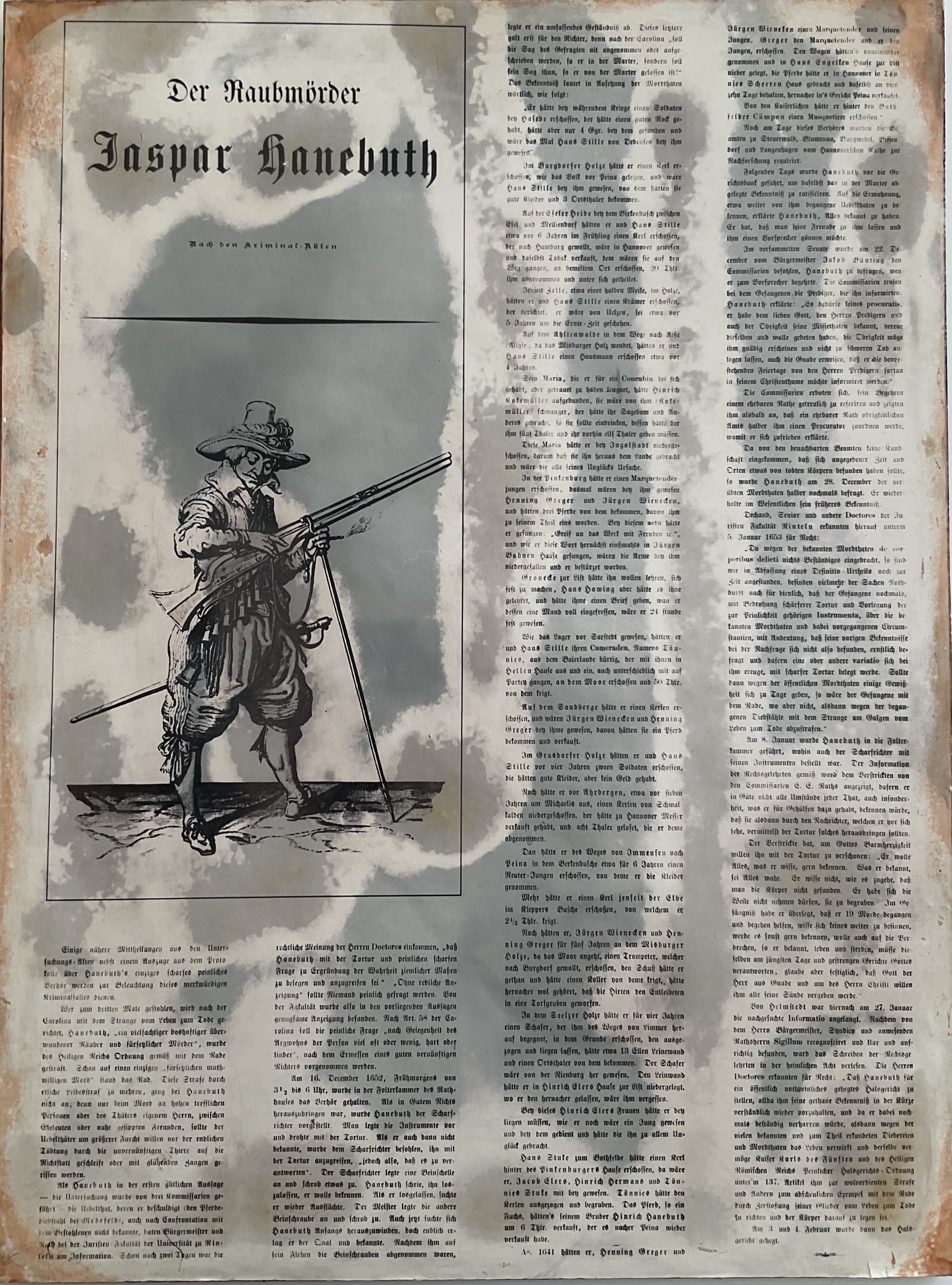

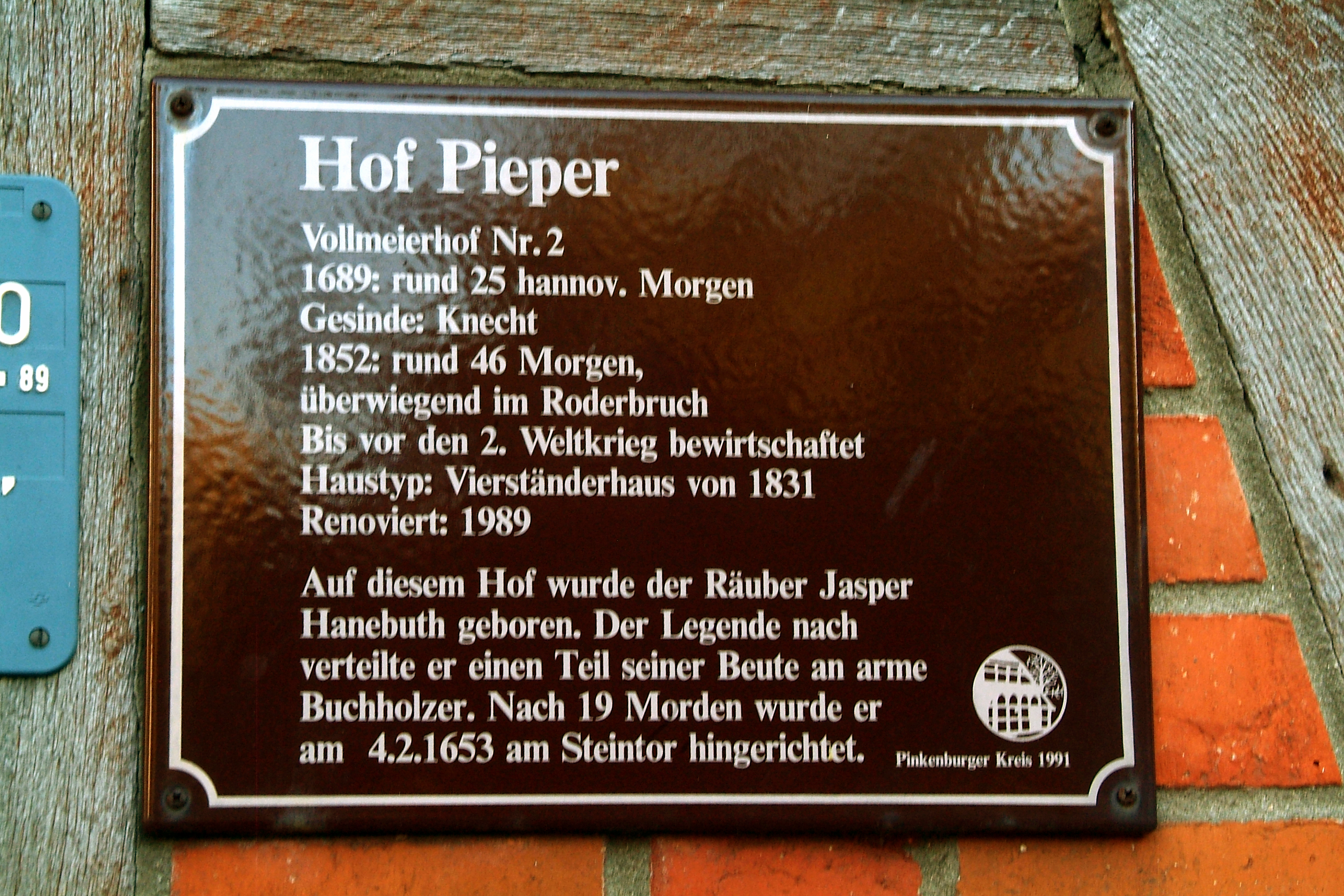
Information board from Pinkenburger Kreis about the birthplace of Hanebuth

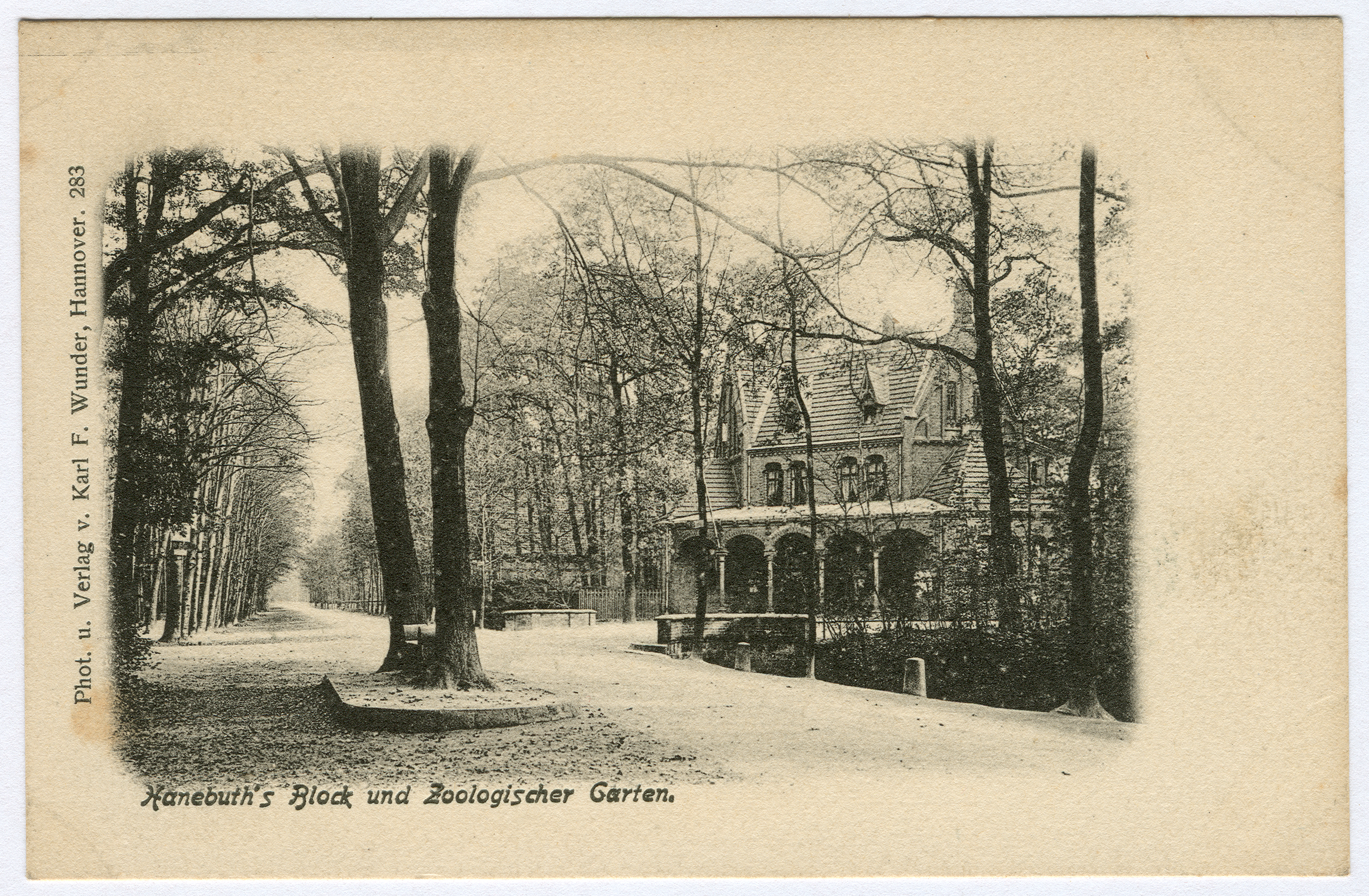
„Hanebuth’s Block“ at the Hanover Zoo Picture postcard number "283", circa 1898 by Karl F. Wunder

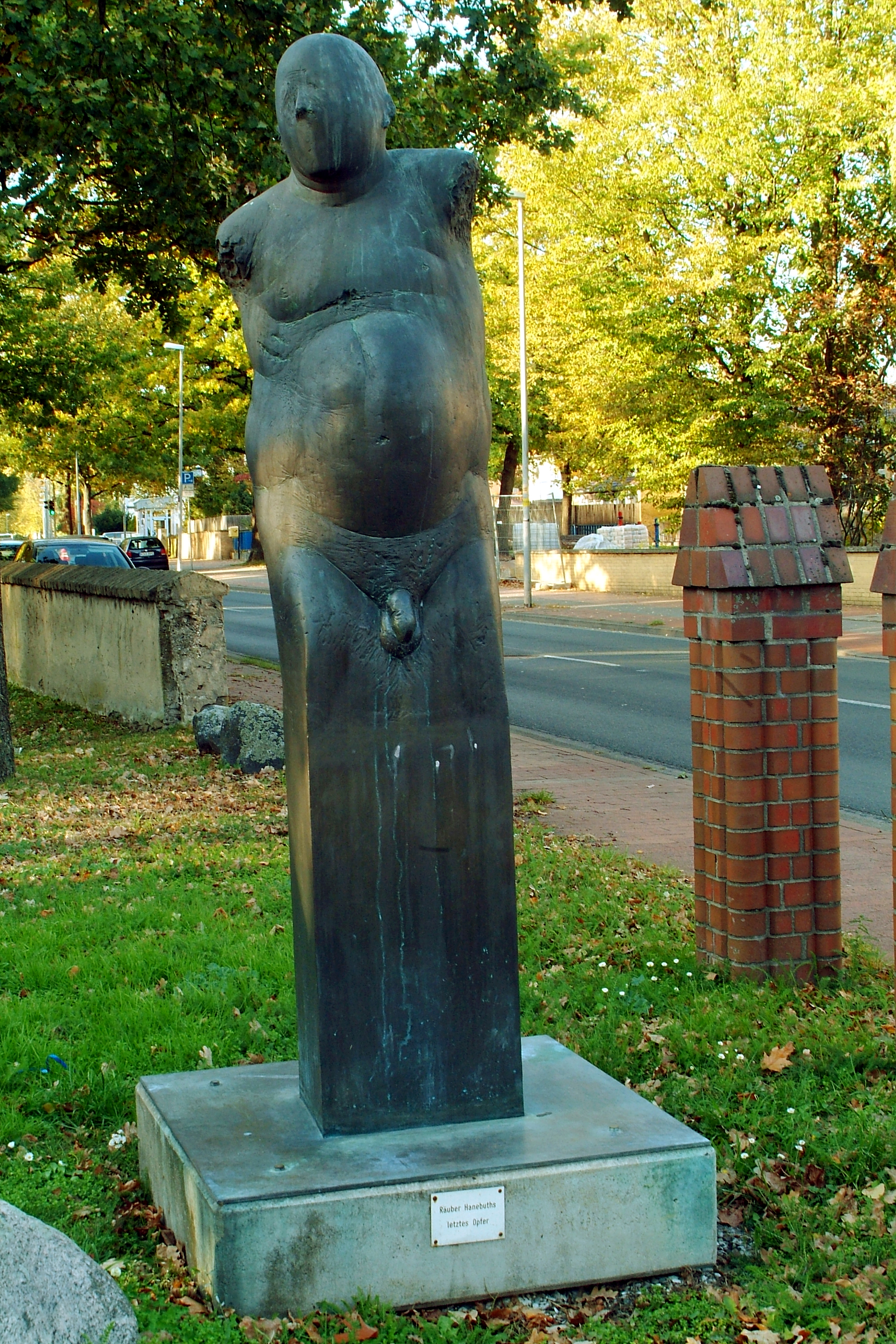
Large pedestral torso XX, „Hanebuth's last victim“

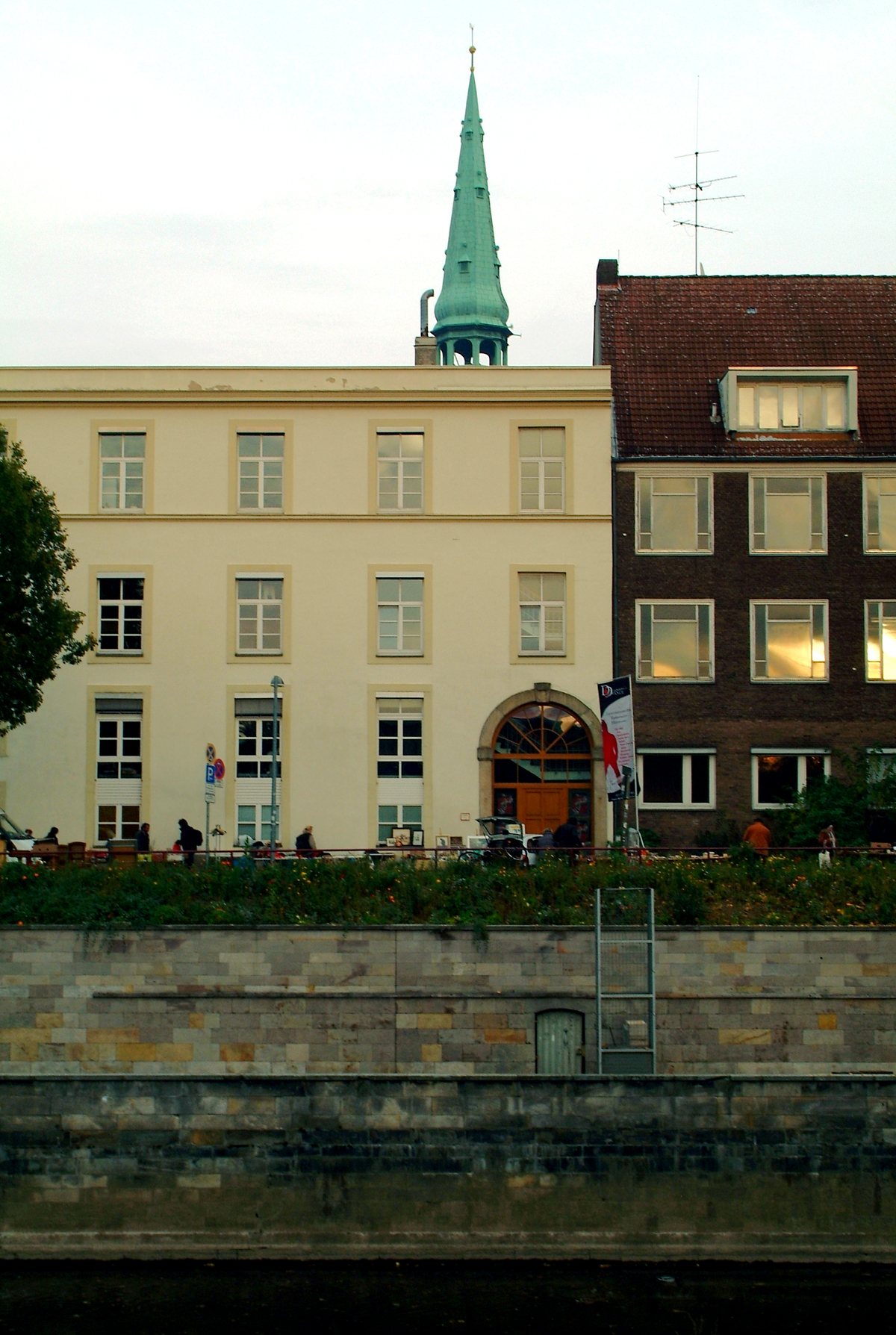
The entrance of Hanebuth's Gang' on the high banks forms a line with the portal of the Royal Hofmarstall and the Kreuzkirche.

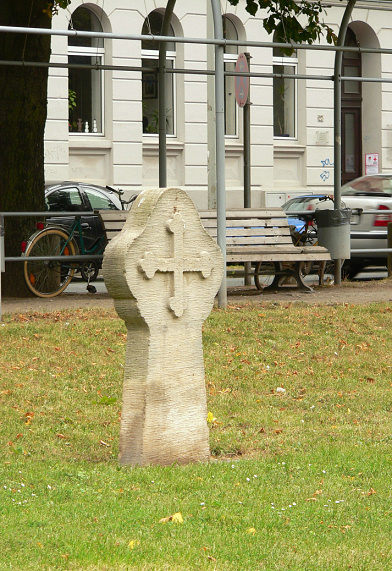
The white cross stone near the Lister mile

Jasper Hanebuth (baptised 8 February 1607 – 4 February 1653) was a German mercenary in the Thirty Years' War, as well as a robber and murderer.

== Life ==
Jasper Hanebuth was born on the "Hof Pieper", a rebuilt half-timbered complex which today is listed on Buchholz-Kirchweg 72. He was the son of Hans Hanebuth, a cotter in Groß-Buchholz, and was baptised on February 8 in Groß-Buchholz near Hanover.

Jasper Hanebuth became a mercenary in Swedish service during the Thirty Years' War. Even during the war, he acquired Hanover citizenship, but soon lost it again as he did not pay his tax debts. Hanebuth was described as a coarse, violent character whose tantrums were feared by those around him. He is considered an example of the everyday violence and brutality of morals after the end of the Thirty Years' War. His victims included his own "robber bride". He subsequently became a horse dealer until he was reported for horse theft and arrested on 14 November 1652, eventually confessing to 10 thefts and 19 murders following repeated threats of torture, "meticulous according to the high justice", in the council of the Altes Rathaus, where he admitted his guilt. Then, after spending nearly a year in prison, on 3–4 February 1653, he was sentenced "to be judged by the breaking wheel by his limbs from life to death".

On 4 February 1653, Hanebuth was executed in Hanover in front of a stone gate on the breaking wheel.

== Aftermath ==
Hanebuth is still present in the consciousness of the Hanoverians:

- For sculptor Peter Köster, who died in 1661, for Jasper Hanebuth's younger brother Hinrich, he created a tombstone that can still be found today at the St. Nicolai church in Bothfeld.
- However, many legends surrounding the robber can not be confirmed from historical sources; according to legend, he had stretched a string over the forest chapel, which was connected with a small bell, so as to be rung when merchants came by. Nor was his home a robber's den in the Eilenriede. Similarly, it has not been proven that he supported the poor from the nearby village of Groß-Buchholz with his prey.
- A cross that existed at the beginning of the stone gate field from the time before Hanebuth's execution was later incorrectly assigned to the event, but then in 1929, it was given the name White Cross Square on the Lister mile.
- "Hanebuth's gang" on the high bank "is probably the remainder of a passage under the city wall to the leash", which was filled up after a short distance.
- At the turn of the 19th century there were still postcards with the motif of "Hanebuth's Block" on the Schiffgraben in front of the former entrance building of the zoo.
- The 1967 street Hanebuthwinkel in Groß-Buchholz on the Eilenriede at Steuerdieb reminds with their naming of the robber.
- Since 1991, the information board "Hof Pieper" in Hanebuth's birthplace has reminded of the criminal.
- In front of the birthplace of Jasper Hanebuth, the sculpture "Large pedestal torso XX" was erected, a work of the sculptor Waldemar Otto from the year 1986 and on loan from the Stübler Gallery. An additional sign with the inscription "Jasper Hanebuth's last victim", was attached to the concrete base below the armless sculpture.
- Related to Hanebuth is the 2010 history novel "The Concubine of the murderer" by Bettina Szrama, in which Hanebuth is seen as "a resurrection as a dark novel hero".

== See also ==
- List of German serial killers

== Literature ==
- Joachim Lehrmann: Robber gangs between Harz and Weser - Hanover, Braunschweig, Hildesheim - A historical review. Lehrte 2004, ISBN 3-9803642-4-0, S. 64–76.
- August Jugler: The robber-killed Jasper Hanebuth. A picture of life from the Thirty Years War. After the criminal = files. Hahn'sche bookstore, Hanover 1880, Hannover 1880, p. 35
- Karl Henninger, Johann von Harten, Lower Saxony's Sagenborn. August Lar Verlag, 3. Aufl. 1927, S. 15 ff.
- Helmut Zimmermann: The origin of the robber-killer Jasper Hanebuth. In: Hanover history sheets, Neue Folge 41, 1987, p. 31–38
- Helmut Zimmermann: The origin of the robber-killed Jasper Hanebuth. In: Friedrich-Wilhelm Busse (Hrsg.): Groß-Buchholz. Pictures and stories from days gone by, Pinkenburger circle. Geiger publisher house, Horb am Neckar 1992, ISBN 3-89264-739-9, S. 28ff.
- Helmut Zimmermann: Hanebuth ... (Jasper and others). In: Hannoversches Biographisches Lexikon, p. 149, 206, 408; partly online: via Google Books
- ders.: Hanebuth, Jasper, in: Stadtlexikon Hannover, S. 252
- Simon Benne: Hanover's robber-killed Hanebuth an his legendary fame. In: Hannoversche Allgemeine Zeitung, 19 February 2010
