= 2012 Berlin darkroom murders =

Series of murders in Germany

Dirk P., better known as the Darkroom Killer, was a German serial killer. His killing spree began in 2012 in darkrooms frequented by gay men. He drugged and then robbed the victims. The serial killing only came to light thanks to a surviving victim, who alerted the authorities.

== Murders ==
In 2012, a series of killing in Berlin drew attention, one of which occurred in a dark room, hence the killer being dubbed the "Darkroom Killer". The first body was discovered on 5 May 2012 at one such darkroom. All victims were drugged, and did not show signs of physical struggle. They were then robbed. The perpetrator was caught after using a victim's credit card to purchase train tickets.

== Perpetrator ==
The perpetrator was a man who was known as "Dirk P.", a 39-year-old teacher in Brandenburg with no prior criminal convictions. Dirk P. was born and raised in the area of Saarbrücken. He was living with his grandparents. His grandfather died early. According to Dirk's aunt, who was 10 years older than him, he was subsequently abused by his grandmother, forced to take his grandfather's place in the wedlock. He grew up to become a nurse, which gave him knowledge of and access to drugs. Still according to the same source, his coming out as gay provoked disgust with his grandmother and he broke up with his family. He went to Berlin, which was known to have a progressive attitude towards gay people. By his own account however, he moved to Berlin because his partner had found a job there.

== Trial, incarceration and death ==
In 2013, Dirk P. was found guilty of triple murder and one attempt of murder. He was sentenced to life imprisonment with a minimum of 25 years. The court settled for greed as a motive, since he had been taking credit cards, wallets or other belongings from his victims.

In 2014, he committed suicide.

== Popular culture ==
In 2024, Netflix produced a documentary series about the case, Crime Scene Berlin: Nightlife Killer, interviewing the police officers on the case, relatives of the victims, and a survivor.
