= Ulrich Schmidt =

German serial killer (born 1957)

- Courtroom sketch of Ulrich Schmidt during a hearing in the Essen District Court.
- Born: 1957 (age 68–69)
- Other name: "The Holiday Killer"
- Convictions: Murder (x5); Attempted murder (x3); Rape (x5); Attempted rape
- Penalty: Life imprisonment

Details
- Victims: 5 killed; 4 survived
- Span of crimes: 1987–1989
- Country: West Germany
- State: North Rhine-Westphalia
- Date apprehended: 8 August 1989

Ulrich Schmidt (born 1957), known as The Holiday Killer, is a German serial killer and rapist who murdered five women in Essen, West Germany, between 1987 and 1989. He also sexually assaulted four other women, most of whom were critically injured as a result. After he left his camera containing photos of him and his victims at the crime scene of his final attack, he was arrested in 1989, and sentenced to life imprisonment in 1991. Schmidt's moniker was derived from the fact that some of his crimes were committed on public holidays.

== Early life ==
Little is known about Schmidt's childhood. However, he came from a broken family and had been admitted to different homes from an early age. He also ran away several times.

== Crimes ==
The first known crime occurred in Essen-Stadtwald on the night of 14 May 1987, when Schmidt attacked a 49-year-old woman on the stairs to the S-Bahn platform. Schmidt put his arm around her neck from behind and demanded money at knifepoint. While the woman was searching through her purse, he cut her neck and pushed her down the remaining steps of the platform. Later, the victim was discovered by passersby, who found help. The woman survived her injuries after undergoing an emergency surgery.

Schmidt struck again on 27 May, one day before Ascension Day. At 11 p.m., Schmidt attempted to rape a 46-year-old pool attendant at the Oase leisure pool at an S-Bahn station in Essen-Frohnhausen. Police arrived at the scene after an emergency call from a passenger who heard the victim screaming. Authorities found the naked corpse of the woman on a meadow below the platform. She had been stabbed 48 times with a screwdriver.

On 8 June 1987, Whit Monday, a 59-year-old woman was attacked by Schmidt at a restroom in Grugapark. Schmidt forced the woman into a stall, where he demanded her money at knifepoint. While trying to tie the victim up, the woman fought back. After a scuffle, Schmidt beat the woman unconscious, bound her hands and legs, and cut her neck, severing her trachea and oesophagus. The woman freed herself after regaining consciousness and reached an ambulance station, from where she was immediately transported to the hospital and survived.

On 5 July 1987, Schmidt murdered a 63-year-old woman who was on her way home between Essen-Kray S-Bahn station and her apartment in Essen-Huttrop. He put his arm around her neck and again demanded money at knifepoint, which the victim immediately handed over to him. When Schmidt started to tie the woman up, she began to call for help, causing him to stab her several times with the knife and flee. The woman was found a short time later by bystanders and taken to hospital but died there almost three weeks later from injuries to the liver, pancreas, stomach, and spleen.

In the early morning of 15 March 1989, Schmidt broke into the house of Elisabeth Fey, 81, in Essen-Holsterhausen, gaining entry by breaking a window. After hitting her several times with a blunt weapon, Schmidt stabbed her to death with a kitchen knife he found in the apartment. He then ransacked the apartment before fleeing the scene. The woman's body was found four hours later by her daughter.

The next murder occurred on Maundy Thursday, 24 March 1989, in the Essen-Margarethenhöhe district. A 19-year-old woman on her way home from the Grugabad metro station was assaulted, bound, stabbed twice in the heart, and then dumped behind a garage complex, where her corpse was discovered by her father. Her body was fully clothed, and no money had been stolen from her.

On 6 June 1989, Schmidt murdered Petra Kleinschmidt, a 23-year-old hall supervisor in an amusement arcade of Essen-Altendorf. Although the young woman was still able to press the alarm button, she bled out from two throat cuts before the police arrived. The victim had been partially undressed.

On 19 June 1989, Schmidt attacked a 41-year-old woman in a parking garage in downtown Essen. As the woman walked to her car, Schmidt wrapped his arm around her neck and demanded money. After receiving the money, he tied up the woman, undressed her, raped her, and stabbed her twice in the throat. After Schmidt left, the victim was able to reach a porters' lodge, where she was rescued.

The last attack happened on 5 August 1989, when Schmidt attempted to rape a 38-year-old geriatric nurse at her apartment in Essen-Rüttenscheid. After the victim called for help, the victim's neighbour rushed to help, causing Schmidt to flee. However, he left his camera, which contained photos of him, his wife, and his victims.

== Arrest and conviction ==
On 8 August 1989, Ulrich Schmidt was arrested near his mother's apartment in Essen. Due to advice from his lawyer, he refused to testify. In the meantime, during a search of his apartment, combat boots matching the shoe prints found at the apartment of Elisabeth Fey were discovered. In four other cases, a connection between the victim and Schmidt could also be established by comparing scent traces. In the controversial procedure, specially trained dogs from the Schloss Holte-Stukenbrock police dog school sniffed out the smell of Schmidt on objects belonging to the victims.

It was also determined that Schmidt often stayed overnight at his brother's workshop, which was located near one of the crime scenes. One of his jackets was found there. The fibres of Schmidt's matched the fibres found at the crime scene of the first murder. Schmidt also confessed to two fellow inmates while he was in custody. He was eventually found guilty of five murders, three attempted murders, five rapes, one attempted rape, one robbery, and two burglaries.

After nearly two years in custody and 19 days on trial, he allowed his lawyer to tell the court that he no longer disputed the allegations of the prosecution. However, he did not want to speak publicly about his actions and motives, but to instead confide in a psychiatrist. After 43 days of sittings and almost a year of proceedings, Ulrich Schmidt was sentenced to life imprisonment in September 1992.
