= Monster of the Andes =

Monster of the Andes may refer to:

- Daniel Barbosa, a mass murderer (also known as "Beast of the Andes")
- Pedro López, a reputed mass murderer
