= Élver James Melchor Bañol =

Colombian rapist and serial killer

- Born: 1976 (age 49–50); Colombia
- Other names: "The Predator of Picaleña" "The Second Garavito"; Julio
- Conviction: Murder ×4
- Penalty: 60 years' imprisonment

Details
- Victims: 4
- Span of crimes: Unknown–2019
- Country: Colombia
- State: Tolima
- Date apprehended: 2019
- Imprisoned at: Coiba Prison, Ibagué

Élver James Melchor Bañol (born 1976) is a Colombian rapist and serial killer. He was convicted of 7 rapes and 4 murders, one of them being that of Rosmery Castellón, a minor.

Nicknamed The Predator of Picaleña, he was compared to the infamous Luis Garavito for the way he acted and approached his victims, all of whom were underage children. Melchor Bañol was initially sentenced to 40 years' imprisonment for three unrelated crimes, but after his last murder, he was given 60 years' imprisonment, the highest-available sentence in Colombian law.

== Profile ==
According to authorities and specialized investigators, Elver acted in the same way as his renowned Colombian counterpart Luis Garavito: he had a habit of stalking minors and adolescents he had picked out, before eventually raping and murdering them.

== Rosmery Castellón case ==
Melchor Bañol confessed to having kidnapped, raped, tortured and murdered 16-year-old Rosmery Castellón in the Tolima Department on February 26, 2019. In his own words, he told the authorities that he had strong sexual urges at that moment, so he decided to kidnap young Rosmery: "The devil entered me and there was nothing else to do." Policemen later found her body in the Vereda Aparco sector, with obvious signs of rape and torture. Melchor was prosecuted for kidnapping, torture, violation of a corpse and femicide, for which he was convicted and sentenced to 60 years' imprisonment, the harshest sentence in the country.

== See also ==
- Luis Garavito
- List of serial killers in Colombia
