= INPE =

INPE may refer to:

- National Institute for Space Research in Brazil (Instituto Nacional de Pesquisas Espaciais)
- National Penitentiary Institute of Peru (Instituto Nacional Penitenciario)
- National Penitentiary and Prison Institute of Colombia (Instituto Nacional Penitenciario y Carcelario)

== See also ==
- National Penitentiary Institute (disambiguation)
