= Instinto Asesino =

- Genre: Documentary
- Directed by: Michela Giorelli, Rafael Rodriguez
- Original language: Spanish
- No. of seasons: 3
- No. of episodes: 24

Production
- Running time: 60 minutes
- Production company: Endemol Argentina

Original release
- Network: Discovery en Espanol
- Release: 6 April 2010 – present

Instinto Asesino (Spanish: [insˈtinto aseˈsino], English: "Killer Instinct") is a series produced by Endemol Argentina for the Discovery Channel. Each episode portrays a notorious criminal case that occurred in a country in Latin America. So far, cases depicted occurred in Argentina, Brazil, Chile, Colombia, Mexico and Venezuela.

The first season features six cases and the death toll caused by the six criminals combined surpasses one hundred victims, most of them women and children.

A second season aired in Latin America, with eight episodes total.

== First season ==
=== 1. "El Monstruo de los Cañaduzales" ===
Broadcast 6 April 2010

The opening episode discusses the case of Manuel Octavio Bermúdez, a Colombian pedophile and serial killer. His Nickname is "El Monstruo de los Cañaduzales" (The Monster of the Cane Fields). He confessed to the rape and murder of 32 children in remote areas of Colombia between 1999 and 2003.

=== 2. "La Mataviejitas" ===
Broadcast 13 April 2010

Juana Barraza is a Mexican thief and serial killer. Her Nickname is "La Mataviejitas" (The Old Lady Killer). Arrested for killing and stealing the possessions of several middle-aged women between the late 1990s and 2006, there are questions about the real number of her victims, estimated between 25 and more than 40.

=== 3. "El Maniaco del Parque" ===
Broadcast 20 April 2010

Francisco de Assis Pereira is a Brazilian rapist and serial killer, known as "O Maníaco do Parque" (The Maniac in the Park). He was arrested for the torture, rape and death of 11 women and for assaulting nine in a park in São Paulo, Brazil during the 1990s. Pereira found his victims by posing as a talent scout for a modeling agency.

=== 4. "Masacre Escolar" ===
Broadcast 27 April 2010

A student, Rafael "Junior" Solich, was responsible for the school shooting at the Islas Malvinas middle school which occurred in 2004 in the city of Carmen de Patagones, Argentina, killing four students and wounding another five. On location filming at the school where the tragedy occurred was blocked by Argentine officials.

=== 5. "El Padrino" ===
Broadcast 4 May 2010

Adolfo Constanzo was an American serial killer, drug dealer and cult leader, known as "El Padrino de Matamoros" (The Godfather of Matamoros). His cult is responsible for a series of human sacrifices in Matamoros, Mexico during the 1980s. He ordered a follower to kill him in the arms of his male lover.

=== 6. "El Vampiro de Niteroi" ===
Broadcast 11 May 2010

Marcelo Costa de Andrade, a Brazilian pedophile and serial killer, confessed the rape and death of 14 children in the Brazilian cities of Rio de Janeiro and Niterói in 1991. His habit to drink the blood of his victims earned him the nickname "O Vampiro de Niterói" (The Vampire of Niterói).

== Second season ==
=== 1. "Bruja Asesina" ===
Broadcast 7 February 2011
In Colombia, the case of a woman claiming to be a witch, and accused of killing at least eight people after being invited to their houses to perform rituals of healing and protection, but drugging her victims before taking their lives instead. Despite being sentenced to forty years of prison, she is currently on house arrest due to misconducts on her trial.

=== 2. "La Massacre de Pozzeto" ===
Broadcast 14 February 2011
Colombia, 1986. A Colombian Vietnam War veteran, Campo Elías Delgado, murders his own mother triggering a killing spree that resulted in thirty people dead, the last to die being the murderer himself. 25 years later, a forensics team try to determine if the man took his own life, or was killed during the shootout with police at the restaurant where his spree ended.

=== 3. "El Monstruo de Rio Claro" ===
Broadcast 21 February 2011
The Brazilian city of Rio Claro was terrorized during the 1990s by Laerte Patrocínio Orpinelli, a serial rapist and killer who according to his own testimony, had taken the lives of at least one hundred children before being arrested. Despite the real number of victims is unknown, he was convicted for the death of at least nine children.

=== 4. "El Maniaco de Trianon" ===
São Paulo, Brazil. By the first years of the decade of 1980, with increasing anxiety in the gay community due to AIDS, a male prostitute, Fortunato Botton Neto, is responsible for the death of 13 of his clients, all of them homosexuals.

=== 5. "La Hiena de Querétaro" ===
1989, Querétaro, Mexico. After having a serious argument with her husband, Claudia Mijangos grabs some knives and slays her three children. Two decades later, there are still many unanswered questions about the crime, including her supposed infatuation with one of the local priests and its possible connection with the murder of her children.

=== 6. "El Sadico" ===
2005, Mexico City. An ex-member of the military, Raúl Osiel Marroquín, pretends to be a homosexual and attracted four young homosexual boys to his house, where they were tortured and executed with the help of an accomplice, regardless of having been paid for their ransoms or not.

=== 7. "La Casa del Horror" ===
2003, Buenos Aires, Argentina. The disappearance of nine-year-old Marela Martínez caused widespread commotion when an international effort to search for the child was established. Five months later, the bodies of two girls raped and beaten to death (including Marela's) were found at a neighbor's house. The arrest of the criminal was only part of the dark story surrounding him and the child's family.

=== 8. "Viuda Negra" ===
2003, Cordoba, Argentina. The suspicious circumstances surrounding the death of a senior citizen put the police on the trail of a "Black Widow" who seduced older men in order to take possession of their assets and even poisoned some of them to death.

== Third season ==
=== 1. "Furia en Caracas" ===
2008, Caracas, Venezuela. A young woman is found murdered. Could the prime suspect, a therapist with over 50 years of experience and Venezuelan presidents among his patients, be a murderer? When police search his home, they find a stash of photographs revealing the extent of the doctor's crimes against women.

=== 2. "Secretos de Familia" ===
2002, Buenos Aires, Argentina. María Marta García Belsunce is found dead. At first, it appears to be an accident, but an autopsy reveals her death to be a homicide.

=== 3. "Entre el Amor y el Espanto" ===
2009, Ibagué, Colombia. A black garbage bag catches the eye of a farmer; its contents turn out to be a woman's head. When she is identified, it is revealed that she is the wife of Joaquín Aldana, a police colonel with an impeccable record who had fought Colombia's drug cartels for years, and is now the man implicated in her murder.

=== 4. "El Atajo de la Muerte" ===
1998, São Paulo, Brazil. Seven-months pregnant, Patricia Aggio Longo is found in a van, shot twice. Her husband, prosecutor Igor Ferreira da Silva, claims that his wife was kidnapped. At first, the prosecutor helps investigators to locate a suspect, but after being unable to identify him, da Silva's own colleagues began to suspect that he knows more about his wife's death than he is saying.

=== 5. "Mil Caras" ===
2009, Bogotá, Colombia. Alejandra Díaz Lezama is murdered, shot once in the head. Her husband, city councillor Vladimir Melo, alleges it to be a murder committed in the course of a robbery, while the police believe her death to be a professional hit. Through an informant, police arrest the killers, who reveal that Alejandra Díaz Lezama was well acquainted with the man who ordered her death.

=== 6. "Codicia Extrema" ===
2004, San Vicente, Argentina. Police respond to a call from Alex Cantero and friend Tito Muñoz, who say they returned home from a night out to find Cantero's parents, Jorge and Minond, and grandmother, Norma, murdered, shot several times. When one of the friends attempt suicide, a third one comes forward to reveal that the two acted together in order win a large inheritance.

=== 7. "La Quintrala" ===
2008, Santiago, Chile. Maria del Pilar Pérez López, an architect known as "La Quintrala," is found unconscious, the result of attempted suicide by painkiller overdose. Two days previously, her niece's boyfriend had been shot to death by a hitman; when the hitman is arrested, he reveals that he was paid by La Quintrala to murder her brother, but the boyfriend was shot accidentally. From here, it is revealed that the boyfriend is far from La Quintrala's only victim.

=== 8. "Justicia para Isabella" ===
2009, São Paulo, Brazil. 5-year-old Isabella Nardoni falls from the sixth floor of a building and dies before arriving at the hospital. What at first appears to be a tragic accident turns sinister when forensic investigators reconstruct the crime and discover that Isabella could not have fallen, but must have been thrown from the window instead.

=== 9. "Los Niños ya están Durmiendo" ===
2002, Zipacón, Colombia. Former Senator Martha Catalina Daniels Guzmán, her friend, and her driver, are found murdered in a ravine. Daniels, whose sister had once been kidnapped by FARC terrorists, was negotiating with the group for the release of hostages. At first, it is believed that Daniels was killed while negotiating a hostage release, but it is soon revealed that a former hostage, her sister, is involved in her death.

=== 10. "Águila o Sello" ===
2010, Monterrey, Mexico. Víctor Castro Santillán, a student, is found murdered near some railroad tracks. At first, his death appears to be related to organized crime. However, it is soon discovered that his death is the result of a love triangle involving a French exchange student and the son of a prominent businessman and politician.
