= List of serial killers in Colombia =

A serial killer is typically a person who murders three or more people, with the murders taking place over more than a month and including a significant period of time between them. The US Federal Bureau of Investigation (FBI) defines serial killing as "a series of two or more murders, committed as separate events, usually, but not always, by one offender acting alone".

== Identified serial killers ==
Name	Years active	Proven victims	Possible victims	Status	Notes	Ref
Andrés Leonardo Achipiz	2009–2013	12	35	Incarcerated	Known as "The Fish"; psychopathic hired killer who killed in Bogotá involved in the drug trade	
José William Aranguren	1956–1964	115	115	Killed in a shootout with law enforcement	Bandit who murdered people across three municipalities, together with three accomplices	
Daniel Camargo Barbosa	1974–1986	72	180	Murdered in prison by a victim's relative	Known as "The Sadist of El Charquito"; raped and murdered young girls across Colombia and Ecuador	
Manuel Octavio Bermúdez	1999–2003	21	50+	Killed in an ambush during a prison transport	Known as "The Monster of the Cane Fields"; raped and murdered children in rural Valle del Cauca	
Cristopher Chávez Cuellar	1990s–2015	6	15+	40 years	Known as "The Soulless"; murdered various people around three municipalities, including three underage brothers	
María Concepción Ladino	1994–1998	6	6	40 years	Known as "The Killer Witch"; fraudster who poisoned victims she had defrauded	
Luis Garavito	1992–1999	142	193+	Died in prison	Known as "The Beast"; tortured, raped, mutilated and murdered children across Colombia, Ecuador and Venezuela	
Sandra Giraldo	2008–2011	3	3+	Incarcerated	Together with Emilsen Rojas and several accomplices, she led "The Black Widow Gang"; defrauded and poisoned men for their life insurance policies	
Pedro López	1969–1980	110	350+	Fugitive	Known as "The Monster of the Andes"; raped and killed young girls across Colombia, Ecuador and Peru	
Luis Alberto Malagón Suárez	1995–2001	6	6+	Incarcerated	Known as "The Sadist of Rincón"; kidnapped, raped, and killed five girls from 1995 to 1997 in Suba, and later killed his wife	
Tomás Maldonado Cera	2002–2018	7	10	Incarcerated	Known as "The Satanist"; murdered victims on or around Halloween night, then carved Satanic symbols on their bodies	
Jaime Iván Martínez	2005–2016	4	25	42 years	Known as "The Guarne Killer"; strangled young children and his wife in Guarne; suspected in other murders	
Élver James Melchor Bañol	1990s–2019	4	4	60 years	Known as "The Predator of Picaleña"; serial child rapist who murdered a girl in Tolima after being released on parole for three similar murders and sex crimes	
John Jairo Moreno Torres	1997–1998	4	20	Murdered in prison by fellow inmates	Known as "Johnny the Leper"; underage gang leader who murdered people who interfered with his criminal activities	
Yadira Narváez	2011	5	6+	100 years	Known as "The Queen of Scopolamine"; poisoned men with Carbofuran to steal their money	
Hernando Arturo Prada	1990s–1999	10	10+	Killed by a paramilitary squad while on the run	Known as "The Angel of Death"; gang leader who killed people in Bucaramanga	
Luis Gregorio Ramírez Maestre	2010–2012	30	30	34 years	Known as "The Monster of Tenerife"; tortured and murdered motorists he came across on highways	
Emilsen Rojas	2008–2011	3	3+	Incarcerated	Together with Sandra Giraldo and several accomplices, she led "The Black Widow Gang"; defrauded and poisoned men for their life insurance policies	
Esneda Ruiz Cataño	2001–2010	3	3	Incarcerated	Known as "The Predator"; poisoned three husbands for their life insurance policies	
Efraín Sarmiento Cuero	2017–2023	3	3	Incarcerated	Known as "The Beast"; murdered girlfriends during arguments, including one during a conjugal visit in prison	
Fredy Armando Valencia	2012–2014	8	100+	36 years	Known as "The Monster of Monserrate"; strangled women around Monserrate, then raped their bodies	
Juan Carlos Villa	2012–2023	11	11	Incarcerated	Murdered 11 people across various municipalities.	
Rubén Villalobos Herrera	2012–2017	9	9	Incarcerated	Known as "The Black Canes Monster"; raped and murdered women in Villavicencio, then had sex with their bodies post-mortem	

== Unidentified serial killers ==
Name	Years active	Proven victims	Possible victims	Regions where active	Notes	Ref
Monster of the Mangones	1963–1970s	30	38	Valle del Cauca	Kidnapped, raped, tortured and then murdered between young boys and teenagers in Cali; investigators believe the killer to have suffered from clinical vampirism	

== See also ==
- Lists of serial killers

== Bibliography ==
- Burkhalter Chmelir, Sandra (2003). "Serial Killers". In Robert Kastenbaum (ed.). Macmillan Encyclopedia of Death and Dying. Vol. 2. New York: Macmillan Reference USA/Thomson/Gale. p. 1. Archived from the original on 3 May 2009.
- Morton, RJ (2005). "Serial murder multi-disciplinary perspectives for investigators" (PDF). Federal Bureau of Investigation.
- Hollandsworth, Skip (2015). The Midnight Assassin (1st ed.). New York: Henry Holt. p. 81. ISBN 978-0-8050-9767-2.
- Lane, Brian; Gregg, Wilfred (1995) [1992]. The Encyclopedia Of Serial Killers. New York City: Berkley Book. ISBN 0-425-15213-8.
