= Jaime Martínez =

Jaime Martínez may refer to:

- Baltasar Jaime Martínez Compañón (1737–1797), Spanish bishop
- Jaime Martínez Tolentino (born 1943), Puerto Rican writer
- Jaime Martínez Veloz (born 1954), Mexican politician
- Jaime Iván Martínez (born 1971), Colombian serial killer
- Jaime Martínez (Spanish politician) (born 1971), Spanish politician in the Balearic Islands
