= Luis Gregorio Ramírez Maestre =

Colombian serial killer (born 1980)

Luis Gregorio Ramirez Maestre
- Born: Luis Gregorio Ramírez Maestre; September 30, 1980 (age 46); Valledupar, Colombia
- Other name: "The Monster of the Rope"
- Conviction: Murder
- Penalty: 34 years in jail

Details
- Victims: 30
- Span of crimes: 2006–2012
- Country: Colombia
- Date apprehended: 2012

Luis Gregorio Ramírez Maestre (born September 30, 1980) is a Colombian serial killer who has been convicted of murdering thirty people in various municipalities and cities in Colombia, including Tenerife, Sabanalarga, Aguachica, Santa Marta, Barrancabermeja, Valledupar and Puerto Wilches.

== Modus operandi ==
Ramírez targeted motorists between 19 and 30 years of age, none of whom measured more than 1.70 meters tall or weighed more than 60 kilos. This was done in order to make them submit easily. His tactic was simple and effective. He took advantage of his charisma and loquacity to generate trust. He asked to be taken on a motorcycle taxi to a carefully chosen place, on the outskirts of the cities where he acted. Taking advantage of the fact that he was in the back of the vehicle and after talking with the driver all the way, when they stopped he held the driver by the throat and suffocated them, taking care of them to not die, until they lost consciousness.

The vast majority of people were killed by suffocation or torture, according to examinations of forensics experts. Also he kept several personal objects from victims, like wallets, cards, cell phones, helmets, etc. Ramírez only confessed to the murder of a person known as John Jairo Amador de la Rosa, after authorities found the body wrapped up in ropes.

It is believed that the murderer was only dedicated to stealing motorcycles in various municipalities, but according to several specialists, Ramírez acted in an antisocial way, similar to a psychopath.

== Arrest and trial ==
He was captured in 2012. He was ultimately found guilty of several murders and sentenced to 57 years in prison, later lowered to 34 years for "acceptance of charges".

Luis Gregorio Ramírez Maestre will be released from prison in the year 2032 when he has been in prison for 20 years, due to the reductions of sentences in the Colombian justice system of three fifths of the sentence.

== See also ==
- List of serial killers in Colombia
- List of serial killers by number of victims

== Bibliography ==
- Cruz, Esteban (2014) Los monstruous en Colombia si existen. Grijalbo. 2013. ISBN 9789588789408.
