= Luis Alberto Malagón Suárez =

Colombian serial killer

- Born: Bogotá, Colombia
- Other name: "The Sadist of Rincón"
- Conviction: Murder

Details
- Victims: 6+
- Span of crimes: 1975–2012
- Country: Colombia
- State: Bogotá
- Date apprehended: 2012
- Imprisoned at: Acacías Prison, Meta Department

Luis Alberto Malagón Suárez is a Colombian rapist and serial killer. Known as The Sadist of Rincón, he kidnapped, raped and murdered 5 minors, as well as his wife. It is believed that he carried out the murders between 1995 and 1997 in the town of Suba, during which he dismembered his victims and disposed of their remains in bin bags.

He is currently held in Acacías Prison, in the Meta Department, for the murder of his wife.

== Murders ==
According to the authorities' investigations, Malagón Suárez committed the murders in the 1990s, in the town of Suba. The victims were identified as Yulie Yesenia Chacón, Andrea García López, Nina Johana Moncada, Yolanda Perdomo and Lid Consuelo Pineda, all minors who lived in the Rincón neighborhood. An investigator of the DAS affirmed that it took 4 years of investigations so Malagón Suárez could be captured; his daughter also told the authorities that in one of the rooms of the house where they lived, constant screams were heard, which Luis claimed came from the neighborhood cats. Finally, the DAS finished the investigation and conducted a search of the house, in which they found various belongings of the victims, among them - clothes, jewels, semen from the killer, hair, saliva and a sharp object. It is believed that the bodies of the murdered children were placed inside bin bags and hidden, since they were never found. One of Malagón's daughters also claimed that he would take the teenage girls to his residence, where he subsequently abuse them, tying up their hands and feet. Despite this, the judge presiding over the case dismissed it, resulting in Malagón Suárez's acquittal.

On February 19, 2001, Malagón Suárez murdered his wife in front of his daughters, stabbing her several times. Previously, he had bound and gagged her in the home.

== Capture ==
Malagón Suárez was captured in 2012, and prosecuted for killing his wife. He was convicted, and sent off to Acacías Prison in Meta.

== See also ==
- List of serial killers in Colombia
- Luis Garavito
