= Efraín Sarmiento Cuero =

Colombian serial killer

- Born: May 20, 1996 (age 30); Policarpa, Nariño, Colombia
- Other name: "The Beast"
- Convictions: Murder x2 Sexual assault
- Penalty: 34 years and 8 months imprisonment (Mendoza); 20 years and 8 months (Muñoz)

Details
- Victims: 3
- Span of crimes: 2017–2023
- Country: Colombia
- States: Valle del Cauca, Nariño, Boyacá
- Date apprehended: 2018
- Imprisoned at: El Barne Prison, Cómbita, Boyacá Department

Efraín Sarmiento Cuero (born May 20, 1996), known as The Beast (Spanish: La Bestia), is a Colombian serial killer and rapist who murdered at least two women from 2017 to 2018. He achieved notoriety in 2023, after murdering his girlfriend during a prison visit, where he was serving prison sentences for the two previous murders.

== Murders ==
Sarmiento's first known victim was Cristiana Mendoza Maya, a girlfriend with whom he went to a hotel in Cali, Valle del Cauca, in April 2017. Her body was later found by hotel staff, with her evidently being raped and strangled to death. An autopsy later determined that Mendoza had also been physically beaten prior to her death.

In November 2018, Sarmiento went to another hotel in Pasto, Nariño, with a woman named Jacqueline Muñoz Ojeda. The couple supposedly got into an argument, after which Sarmiento beat her up and then strangled Muñoz using a belt. He would be arrested shortly after this murder, linked to the previous one, and would be tried for both crimes, as well as a sexual assault committed in 2019. He was found guilty for both murders, receiving 34 years and 8 months for the former, and 20 years and 8 months for the latter.

=== Prison murder ===
Following his conviction, Sarmiento was transferred to the El Barne Prison in Cómbita, Boyacá. As he was allowed to use social media, he went on a dating site and soon established a long-distance relationship with 33-year-old Merly Andrea Rengifo Cuadros, a housemaid from Cali and mother of two. After talking to her for some time, he finally admitted that he was imprisoned, but claimed that he was an innocent man who was wrongfully convicted because of an extortion plot. Rengifo believed his lies and did not inquire further about his background, and would go so far to visit him once per month for conjugal visits. Sarmiento slowly grew more and more controlling of her, frequently demanding that she tell him who she was with and send real-time photos to confirm where she was at.

On Mother's Day, May 14, 2023, Rengifo decided to visit her boyfriend in prison. An argument suddenly erupted between them, after which Sarmiento grabbed a shiv and cut her throat. According to INPEC employees, the victim was found inside the cell at 10:05 AM, showing extensive bruises on her legs, cheeks, chest and neck. Sarmiento would later say that he inflicted these wounds so "other people would realize that she had an owner."

Following this murder, the Attorney General's Office requested stricter security measures due to the fact Sarmiento was too dangerous to be housed with other inmates. He was subsequently charged with femicide, and is currently awaiting trial.

== See also ==
- List of serial killers in Colombia
