= Hernando Arturo Prada =

Colombian criminal and serial killer (1974–2000)

- Born: Hernando Arturo Prada González; 1974; Bucaramanga, Colombia
- Died: February 21, 2000 (aged 25–26); La Moneda, Santander, Colombia
- Cause of death: Ballistic trauma
- Other names: "The Angel of Death" "Naño"
- Conviction: Murder x10
- Penalty: 55 years imprisonment

Details
- Victims: 10+
- Span of crimes: 1990s–1999
- Country: Colombia
- State: Santander

Hernando Arturo Prada González (1974 – February 21, 2000), known as The Angel of Death (Spanish: El Ángel de la Muerte), was a Colombian criminal and serial killer responsible for at least 10 murders in Bucaramanga in the 1990s.

Sentenced to 55 years imprisonment, he later hijacked a plane during a prison transfer, but was gunned down after a paramilitary squad noticed the incident.

== Hijacking and death ==
In February 2000, Prada was ordered transported from La Modelo to another prison in Cúcuta, near the border with Venezuela. He was boarded on a commercial airliner, the AeroTACA 7683, accompanied by several crew members. Due to security oversights, eight minutes into the flight, Prada pulled out a knife and threatened the fellow passengers, before going to the pilot's cabin and ordering that he land on an airstrip in Aguachica. Once the plane landed, Prada took INPEC employee Elkin Cristancho hostage and travelled towards the village of La Moneda.

Unbeknownst to either party, the whole incident was noticed by a group of paramilitary operatives, whose leader, Commander Julián, ordered that they inspect the landing site. Upon learning that it was a kidnapping, the operatives chased after Prada, and three hours later, they located both him and Cristancho. Prada was killed in the process, while the unharmed Cristancho was returned to his co-workers. Several days later, several INPEC officials interviewed members of the paramilitary group, who recalled the whole incident.

A subsequent investigation by the Santander police revealed several crucial irregularities pertaining to the detention of Prada, both at the airport and when boarded at the plane. According to Police Chief Victor Manuel Pérez, Prada had managed to smuggle in a knife by avoiding the metal detector, likely arranged by bribing several officials. In addition, a flight dispatched had notified the crew that their passenger should not be handcuffed, and the security guards had locked away their weapons in a safe box for no discernible reason, which allowed Prada to freely hijack the plane.

== See also ==
- List of serial killers in Colombia

== Bibliography ==
- Michael Newton (2006). The Encyclopedia of Serial Killers. Infobase Publishing. ISBN 9780816069873.
