= Pedro López (serial killer) =

Colombian serial killer (born 1948)

- López in a c. 1980 police mugshot
- Born: Pedro Alonso López; 5 October 1948 (age 78) (if still alive); Tolima Department, Colombia
- Disappeared: 22 September 1999 (aged 50); Bogotá, Colombia
- Other names: El Monstruo de los Andes (The Monster of the Andes); El Estrangulador de los Andes (The Strangler of the Andes); Pedro Alonso López Monsalve; Pedro Armando López
- Status: Released in 1998
- Convictions: Vehicle theft, murder, rape, kidnapping
- Penalty: 7-year sentence in Colombia, extended to 9 due to in-prison homicide (1969–1978); 16-year sentence in Ecuador, released after 14 years (1980–1994); committed to mental hospital in Colombia (1994–1998)

Details
- Victims: 110 confirmed victims (López claimed to have killed more than 300 people)
- Span of crimes: 1969–1980
- Country: Colombia, Ecuador, Peru
- States: Tolima (Colombia); Tungurahua (Ecuador); Ayacucho (Peru)
- Date apprehended: 9 March 1980 (first arrest for serial murders)

Pedro Alonso López (born 5 October 1948 – disappeared 22 September 1999), also known as the Monster of the Andes, was (or is, depending on whether or not he is still alive) a Colombian serial killer, child rapist, and fugitive who murdered a minimum of 110 people, mostly pre-teen girls, from 1978 to 1980. López claimed to have murdered over 300 people in Colombia, Ecuador, and Peru. He is considered by many as one of the most prolific serial killers and rapists in history.

== Early life ==
Pedro Alonso López was born on 5 October 1948 in Tolima Department, Colombia, (Note: López and his mother stated that his birth date was 5 October 1948 and that he was born in El Espinal, while later sources give the birthdate 8 October in 1948 or 1949, and the birthplaces Santa Isabel or Venadillo.) as the seventh of thirteen children born to Benilda López de Castañeda, a laundry worker. The family formerly lived in Saldaña, where his father Midardo Reyes, a rancher by trade, was murdered six months before López's birth in an ambush shooting while defending a neighbouring hamlet during La Violencia. Benilda stated that Midardo was a local leader of a self-protection group aligned with the Colombian Liberal Party, while later accounts describe him as a member of the Conservative Party. Benilda subsequently fled the area for her mother's home in El Espinal, where, bedridden out of grief, she remained under the care of midwives until her son's birth.

López claimed that he had a difficult childhood due to the violence of the household and the absence of a father. He characterised his mother as a prostitute who "was only good for putting children into this world, each from different men", and that he often saw his mother and stepfather have sex in front of him. Childhood neighbours stated that López's mother was strict and often forbade him from playing with them. His mother stated that her son's hatred of her manifested early on, with López often telling his mother directly that he couldn't stand her while still a young child.

According to López, he was banished from the house at age eight when his mother caught him groping the chest of his sister, subsequently spending time homeless around Tolima for a year, during which time he was raped by a man who had lured him to a house with the false promise of shelter and food. His mother claimed that she never took notice of any abnormal behaviour from López and that he ran away from home on his own accord on 5 April 1958 in an act of rebellion against her, presuming that he did not want to live with his mother any longer.

Regardless of the circumstances, López relocated to Bogotá, aged ten, where he joined a gang of street children for protection, through whom he began using basuco and cannabis to stave off the ill effects of malnutrition. While begging around the city, López was occasionally sexually assaulted. At age twelve, he was adopted by an American immigrant family, but ran away the same year after stealing money from them. López claimed that he fled because a male teacher at the orphan's school had sexually harassed him, while later biographers suggest that no such incident occurred and that López left because he felt unable to trust his adoptive family after previous negative experiences with strangers.

=== First murders ===
In 1969, López was sentenced to seven years in prison for auto theft. Two days after arriving at La Modelo prison, he was raped by four other inmates. López did not report the assault and instead killed three of the rapists with a makeshift knife over the course of two weeks. While the killings were described as self-defence and considered such by prison staff, his sentence was nevertheless extended by two years.

== Serial killings ==
After his release in 1978, López began wandering throughout the northwestern area of South America. According to López, he usually stayed in Bogotá and would traverse the departments of Tolima, Huila, Cauca, and Nariño to enter Ecuador, through which he would pass into Peru. To acquaintances, he claimed to do migrant work in the Llanos on the border to Venezuela.

He later claimed that between 1978 and 1980, he had killed over 100 girls, mainly street children and those from indigenous tribes. While these claims are unverifiable, it is known that López was briefly captured by indigenous Peruvians in the Ayacucho region after attempting to abduct a 9-year-old girl from her village. The Ayacuchoans beat López for several hours before stripping him of his clothes and burying him up to the neck in sand. It's most often reported that their intention was to kill López through live burial, although he would later claim that the tribespeople had poured syrup on him in order for ants to eat him alive. However, an American missionary convinced them to release López and turn him over to the police. The police did not detain López, and he was instead expelled from the country.

After his deportation from Peru, López resumed his killing spree in Ecuador, and although authorities began to notice an increase of missing persons, more specifically young girls, throughout areas where he travelled, they concluded the disappearances were most likely cases of human trafficking.

On 5 May 1979, López met Hortensia Garcés Lozada in Ambato as she was selling newspapers. He gave the girl 100 sucres to follow him and raped and killed her under a nearby bridge. On 14 December 1979, while in his hometown of El Espinal, López raped and murdered Flor Alba Sánchez. Also in El Espinal, there were two other murders of young girls on 21 December 1979 and 3 January 1980. Sánchez was found 20 days later buried on municipal property alongside another girl, Blanca Bautista, both bearing signs of torture. Sánchez is the only Colombian victim for whom López was tried. There were reportedly other criminal cases involving López, but the files were lost in a fire at the El Espinal courthouse. On 10 January 1980, he abducted Ivanova Jácome at a parking lot in Totoras, a suburb of Ambato, as she was heading for school. Jácome was raped and murdered in a nearby shack, with her body being discovered at Ambato's Plaza Urbina on 15 February.

López was frequently spotted at Plaza Urbina, claiming to be a fellow street merchant, but he was instead usually seen frequenting market stalls staffed by young girls, offering them a 100 sucre coin if they accompanied him, typically claiming to need a city guide or directions to a bus stop. He was often seen listening to the hawking of newspaper vendors, who read aloud the newest developments on the mounting cases of child disappearances, bearing a "crooked grin". Even when he didn't talk with children at the market, López was easily identified in the crowds due to his tall stature, prominent nose, lack of upper front teeth and a large scar on his right cheek.

In early 1980, two of the young vendors, florist Luz Marina Lozada and beverage vendor Marina Cuenca, were left alone after declining López's money, but they informed merchants of López's behaviour, believing he might be a child trafficker. On 9 March 1980, López tried to abduct 9-year-old Carmen Lozada, but her cries alerted bystanders, with López fleeing without the girl. Carmen identified López as the man who had previously offered her sister Luz Marina money. One of the first people who reached the scene, the plaza's merchant board president, Carolina Román Poveda, (Note: Often reported as Carlina or Carvina) ran around the market, trying to rally other merchants to search for the attempted kidnapper. She was ignored because of the heavy business, with some saying she was being paranoid due to the news. She followed López out of the market and caught him talking to another 9-year-old girl, claiming to be a lost visitor and offering 100 sucres to be guided around, which the girl accepted. Román intervened as López was leading the girl to a secluded path, shouting that López was going to sell the child and threw herself on López. Bystanders were first inclined to believe López, who claimed ignorance and called Román crazy, and told her to let him go free. However, due to her insistence and the fact that she said that López already tried to kidnap two other girls, the crowd was convinced to bring López back to the plaza, shoving and punching him along the way. Román's fellow merchants were critical of her accusation and also wanted to release López, but she demanded him to be given to the authorities. López was brought to a police station, but he was released shortly after.

In April, the areas surrounding Ambato were hit by flash flooding, unearthing the remains of four more young girls who had been previously reported missing. As the bodies bore signs of strangulation, the police reopened their investigations, contributing towards López's ultimate arrest later that same year.

== Arrest and confession ==
Three days after the flood, López approached 12-year-old Marina (or María) Román Poveda, who was working at the Plaza Rosa market on at Plaza Urbina. López flirted with the girl and offered her 100 sucres to show him around the city, but she refused to go with the stranger. She told her mother Carolina of López's advances, and recognising López, she screamed at him and grabbed him by the arm. She told bystanders that López had tried to abduct her daughter and was potentially responsible for the murders of the recently discovered girls. Local merchants were able to overpower López and hold him until the police arrived.

While in police custody after his arrest, López initially refused to cooperate during his interrogation, choosing to remain silent. Eventually, he began to confess his crimes to police captain Pastor Córdova Gudino, who posed as a fellow prisoner and shared a cell with López for 27 days. López boasted that in total, he had murdered a hundred in Colombia, at least 110 in Ecuador and "many more" in Peru. He described his modus operandi as first luring the victim away from public spaces with a trinket, money, candy, or a job offer, before raping and strangling them with his bare hands for around 15 minutes. López would then embrace their corpses, referring to them as "muñequitas" ("dollies"), until they became cold, leaving them at the scene and returning later to cover them up more thoroughly. He additionally claimed that he would occasionally exhume the victim's bodies from their burial site and have "tea parties" with them. When asked about his motive for the murders, López reportedly said: "I lost my innocence at age of eight. So I decided to do the same to as many girls as I could." In a 1992 interview, López admitted that he killed solely for sexual pleasure, saying in regards to why he targeted young girls, "It's like eating chicken. Why have old chicken when you can have young chicken?". He emphasised in several interviews with Colombian and American media that he found it important that the victims stay conscious "until the lights in their eyes go out" during strangulation, calling it a "divine moment" and "terribly exciting".

Because police voiced doubts about the authenticity of his confession, López offered to direct the authorities to sites where he had left some of the victims. In this first instance, he led Ambato police and families of victims west of the city, to a canyon of the Ambato River. Officers recalled that López bore a "childish grin" upon their arrival by car and pointed to a pile of old newspapers held down by rocks beneath a bridge, where they found the body of Hortensia Garcés Lozada. Police had to lock López in the patrol car to prevent angry families from lynching the murderer. While driving to the second location, López explained how he lured Garcés away in broad daylight with several pedestrians nearby. Police were then led to an empty house, where the decomposing body of an unidentified girl was found. López told officers a few days later how he had met the victim in central Ambato, convinced her to accompany him out of town via bus and walked her around the countryside for several hours before finding the abandoned building, where he raped the girl for twelve hours before killing her. Officers under Pastor Córdova maintained an amicable tone with López to ensure his cooperation. López led investigators to several more sites, most located along the highway from Ambato to Quito, and recalled the course of many of the murders before eventually refusing to talk further, claiming his "friendship" with police had been betrayed.

Ultimately, the bodies of 53 girls, aged eight to thirteen, were found, several in a forest near Ambato. While another 28 sites named by López did not yield any human remains, police attributed this to scavenging animals unearthing and scattering the body parts. Given the discovery of the mass grave, his estimate of 110 murders in Ecuador was accepted as legitimate. Authorities did not charge him with the total of 350 confessed murders since most of them took place outside of Ecuador and it was considered too costly to hold additional trials in Colombia and Peru.

In 1980, López's trial began at the court of Ambato under judge José Roberto Cobos Moscoso; he was charged with 57 counts of murder. On 27 January 1981, he was found guilty of three of the murders and received a sentence of 16 years, the maximum prison sentence available in Ecuador at the time.

== Imprisonment and release ==
López served his prison sentence at the Garcia Moreno prison near Quito. He was frequently subject to knife attacks by fellow inmates, leading to increased security for him. Throughout the early 1990s, López was often interviewed by journalists and usually made contradictory statements about the murders. López bragged about the rush he felt when strangling the victims, but at other times, he claimed that he was only an accomplice to the actual perpetrator, a man named Jorge Patiño. Regarding the latter claim, López stated that he only helped Patiño bury the bodies after being raped by Patiño, and that he eventually murdered Patiño with a knife in Durán.

His projected release date was controversial, with numerous lawyers petitioning an extension of his sentence or additional convictions. He was released from prison two years early, on 31 August 1994. In an interview shortly before his release, López described himself as "the man of the century" and said he was being released for "good behavior". López was transported from Quito to Ibarra, where a judge had ordered for his deportation. Members of the press and the public were present at the court, with López shaking hands with several people on the way. After the deportation order was read, police seized López and took him to a different vehicle for transport to the Colombian border, driving around for five hours until nightfall to lose any potential pursuers, as the families of his victims had placed several bounties on López, the highest being $25,000.

In Colombia, López was received by DAS officers, but since there was no warrant by Colombia against him, police had to temporarily keep López at a hotel in Pasto. While his room was kept under surveillance, the door was left unlocked, though López did not attempt escape for fear of being killed by vigilantes. After a week, an arrest warrant was issued from El Espinal, based on suspicion of over a dozen murders, though there had not yet been any official case filed against López. He was transported to the town, but after the van with López inside was ambushed by an angry mob of 2,000 people, López was transported to Bogotá for a medical examination until the situation had calmed in El Espinal. López again pled with attending doctors to release him, but he was returned to El Espinal, where Alba Sánchez had now filed a complaint to the town's court over the murder of her daughter, as the state of her body was similar to that of the girls murdered in Ecuador. López was convicted of the murder of Flor Alba Sánchez, however, a physician believed there López had signs of psychosis, for which he would need psychological treatment. The diagnosis was challenged and López was designated as having "unhealthy personality traits" rather than a mental disorder, for which he was sent to the psychiatric ward of La Modelo prison. He did not receive medication and was noted as an unremarkable patient, who occupied himself with heavy exercise, reading and watching television. López was reported as keeping a well-groomed appearance, but unlike in Ecuador, he was never interviewed by the Colombian press due to a lack of interest.

In February 1998, López was declared sane and released on bail equivalent to US$70, on the condition that he would periodically report to his authorities and attend appointments with his therapist; he almost immediately absconded. Ecuador's press as well as the country's branch of AFP reported on several alleged sightings in Tulcán and Ibarra, as well as a supposed capture in Cuenca that ended in López's escape, but these claims were never verified. Within the year, López visited his mother to ask for money, but after she rejected this due to her own poverty, her son took her mattress and a chair from the home and sold them on the street before leaving.

The last reported sighting of López was on 22 September 1999, when he visited the National Civil Registry in Bogotá to renew his citizenship card. He had used the identity card of a 60-year-old man from Aipe named Israel Césped to bypass checkpoints.

In 2002, Colombian National Police and Interpol issued warrants for López's arrest over a murder bearing some similarities to his modus operandi. The Interpol warrant was deactivated in 2005, based on a claim by the National Institute of Forensic Medicine that an abandoned corpse had been identified as López, which was accepted by the National Registry, but he remains a fugitive. López has also been named as a possible suspect in the killing of Andrea Marcela García Buitrago in Tunja, Colombia in 2012, due to similarities with his 1979 murder of Flor Alba Sánchez.

== Victims ==
The most commonly reported victim count of 110 (not including the three prisoners killed by López in 1969) is based on López's admission to Ecuadorian authorities, who chose to only pursue those he stated to have killed within Ecuador. Police searches in "almost every province" recovered several remains around Ambato and Santo Domingo, as well as individual gravesites near villages in cantons including La Troncal, Tulcán, Quito, Azogues, Manta, and Salcedo. Of the Ecuadorian victims, only 17 were identified. Although López stated that he killed a hundred victims in Colombia, he only confirmed the murder of two children in El Espinal. There are no known records about the victims murdered in Peru.

=== Ecuador ===
- Hortensia Garcés (or García) Lozada (11)
- Ivanova Jácome (9)
- María Clara Juela Vascurí (10)
- María Medina Jordán (12)
- María Soledad Arias Ontaneda (10)
- Rocío del Pilar Lozada López (11)
- Mercedes Verónica Infante Díaz (9)
- Isabel Cristina Recalde (11)
- Hortensia Jara Sanasano (10)
- Wilma Margoth Punina Chicaiza (12)
- Leonor Solís Santamaría (13)
- María Rosario Morocho Mabanda (13)
- María de las Mercedes Valencia Atig (12)
- Amada Mireya Naranjo Jeréz (13)
- Rita Eulalia Paleón (10)
- Juana Lucía Chimaná Pérez (10)

=== Colombia ===
- Flor Alba Sánchez (11 or 12)
- Blanca Bautista (9 or 12)

== Coverage ==
Colombian journalist Jairo Enrique Gómez Remolina was one of the first authors to write about the case of Pedro López (pseudonymised as Pablo Alonso Lopera). He travelled through Colombia's Andean Region to talk with parents whose daughters had gone missing around the same time of López's murders and confronted him with these accusations during a prison interview in 1981. Gómez Remolina is credited with connecting him to child disappearances and killings in El Espinal, Pasto, Neiva, La Plata, Popayán, and El Bordo, although these were ultimately not definitively proven. He also speculated that López was responsible for the murders of young boys committed by the unidentified Monster of the Mangones (López denied travelling through Cali) as well as those of teenage girls by the Sadist of El Charquito (later attributed to Daniel Camargo Barbosa), later writing about López's prison interactions with Camargo Barbosa. Gómez Remolina was killed in 1986 during the Pozzetto massacre, having sat directly next to the perpetrator, Campo Elías Delgado. In 1992, (Note: The interview is sometimes mistakenly dated to 1998 due to it being republished following López's release and disappearance.) López was also filmed and interviewed by American journalist Ronald Laytner of the National Examiner.

While media interest outside of Latin America was initially low, he received more coverage in the years building up to his release and disappearance, often being referenced as a comparison to newly discovered serial killers, such as Luis Garavito and Harold Shipman, in the years after due to his high victim count.

Editions of Guinness World Records between 2001 and 2007 included López in the Crime (alternatively the Crime and Punishment) category, initially as the "most prolific modern serial killer", below the "most prolific murderers" Indian bandit leader Thug Behram and Hungarian noblewoman Elizabeth Báthory. As the alleged victim count of the latter two was subject to dispute, later editions only included López as the "most prolific serial killer". The listing was removed in newer editions after complaints that it made a competition out of murder. López was again listed in the 2012 edition in the Big Stuff section. The Guinness World Records website continued to list López as "most prolific serial killer" until also being removed, while maintaining listings such as Jane Toppan as "most prolific serial killer (female)" and Behram as "most prolific murderer".

== See also ==
- List of fugitives from justice who disappeared
- List of serial killers in Colombia
- List of serial killers by number of victims
