= José Aranguren (disambiguation) =

José Aranguren (1875–1939) was a Spanish general.

The name may also refer to:

- José Julián de Aranguren (1801–1861), Spanish archbishop
- José William Aranguren (1935–1964), Columbian serial killer
