= Tomás Maldonado Cera =

Colombian satanist, rapist and serial killer

- Born: 1971 (age 54–55); Barranquilla, Atlántico Department, Colombia
- Other name: "The Satanist"
- Conviction: Murder

Details
- Victims: 7–10
- Span of crimes: 2002–2018
- Country: Colombia
- State: Atlántico Department

Tomás Maldonado Cera (born 1971), known as The Satanist, is a Colombian rapist and serial killer. His nickname originates from the fact that after killing his victims, he marked them with satanic symbols.

Most of the victims were raped and later killed by means of blows to the head and usage of sharp weapons.

He was captured in 2019.

== Crimes ==
The murders occurred between 2002 and 2018. The first victim was Rolando Romero Romero, who was stabbed 25 times and had the letter "Z" carved onto his forehead. The others were both men and women, several of them being members of the LGBT community.

All these events occurred in remote and desolate places in Barranquilla. The last victim was Brenda Pájaro, a woman who lived in the city and was found in a lonely place in the Miramar neighborhood, in the North-Central Historical District. It is believed that she was murdered on the date of her disappearance: July 25, 2018.

== Rituals and symbolism ==
According to the authorities' investigations, the bodies of most victims killed by Cera had some parts amputated, with the words "Sign of Voor" carved on them, a saying formerly used for invoking gods. Other stars and hexagrams were also exhibited on the corpses, the latter being used in ancient times for magical rites and practises, as well as the five-pointed star or an inverted pentagram. In the places where they were found, satanic writings and symbols were found in the sand.

Most of the victims were killed before October 31, the date on which Halloween is celebrated.

== See also ==
- List of serial killers in Colombia
- List of serial killers by number of victims
