= Esneda Ruiz Cataño =

Colombian serial killer (born 1968)

- Born: 1968 (age 57–58); Dabeiba, Antioquia, Colombia
- Other names: "The Predator" "The Black Widow"
- Conviction: Murder

Details
- Victims: 3
- Span of crimes: 2001–2010
- Country: Colombia
- State: Antioquia
- Date apprehended: 2012
- Imprisoned at: El Pedregal Prison

Esneda Ruiz Cataño (born 1968), known as The Predator and The Black Widow, is a Colombian serial killer. She collected millions of financial proceeds through life insurances of her husbands.

According to the authorities, Cataño could have received about 150,000,000 pesos. She was arrested in the municipality of Ebéjico and is serving her sentence in a prison for women.

== Biography ==
Esneda Ruiz Cataño was born in Dabeiba, in the Antioquia Department. According to the investigating Colombian authorities, the murders occurred between 2001 and 2010, all against her husbands, with Cataño acquiring their life insurance after. The first victim was identified as Juan Pablo Aristizábal Gutiérrez, who was killed on June 16, 2001, in a village called El Tablazo, in the municipality of Rionegro, dating on Father's Day. Cataño was investigated for the murder, but was released, so she returned to Medellín to get the insurance. The second person killed was José Valencia Guzmán, which occurred in 2006 in the commune of Aranjuez, on Valentine's Day. He was killed near a pool, after Cataño stabbed him in the neck. The authorities again conducted an investigation, but nobody was arrested. The third and last victim was Miguel Ángel Beleño Mejía, who died in 2010 of a stab in the neck, acquiring a life insurance of 80 million pesos.

== Capture ==
Cataño was issued an arrest warrant for the three murders. The police sought her for 2 years, when she was finally detained in Ebéjico, where she lived. She was tried and convicted for aggravated homicide.

She is currently being held in El Pedregal Prison in Medellín.

== See also ==
- List of serial killers in Colombia
