= Black Widow Gang =

Colombian serial killers

- Other name: "The Black Widows of Colombia"
- Conviction: Murder

Details
- Victims: 3+
- Span of crimes: 2008–2011
- Country: Colombia
- State: Antioquia
- Date apprehended: 2011

The Black Widow Gang, also known as The Black Widows of Colombia, was a group of Colombian serial killers active during the late 2000s and early 2010s. They were charged with the murders of three men in Antioquia, and it is believed they were responsible for further crimes.

The criminal network, composed mainly of women, was led by Sandra Giraldo and Emilsen Yulima Nataly Rojas. Each member had a different role within the gang, some focused on maintaining relationships with men, others on murdering them; yet more were in charge of finding lawyers and managing life insurance collections. The total amount from said insurance ranged from one hundred to eight hundred million pesos.

== Victims ==
One of the victims was Diego Hernández Beltrán, a 60-year-old master builder. According to the investigators, Hernández Beltrán was persuaded by an acquaintance of his to buy life insurance. When they learned of this, the gang decided to take advantage of it and invited Diego to camp at night near a reservoir called El Peñol-Guatapé on September 27, 2008. There, his hands and feet were tied and he was thrown into the reservoir, where he subsequently drowned. Hernández Beltrán's lifeless body was found the next day and claimed by Emilsen, who claimed to be his wife, with the couple having been married for two years. At the time, she claimed that she was the sole beneficiary for the life insurance, worth $150,000,000 pesos. The family of the deceased disputed her claims, stating that Diego had never had any romantic bond with the woman.

== See also ==
- List of serial killers in Colombia
