= John Jairo Moreno Torres =

Colombian gang leader and serial killer

- Born: 1979; Bogotá, Colombia
- Died: June 11, 1998 (aged 18–19); La Modelo Prison, Bogotá, Colombia
- Cause of death: Homicide
- Other name: "Johnny the Leper"
- Status: Murdered before trial

Details
- Victims: 4+
- Span of crimes: 1997–1998
- Country: Colombia
- State: Bogotá
- Date apprehended: February 27, 1998

John Jairo Moreno Torres (1979 – June 11, 1998), known as Johnny the Leper, was a Colombian serial killer.

He was murdered in La Modelo prison at age 19, after being beaten, stabbed and finally shot to death.

== Biography ==
John Jairo Moreno Torres was born in the Colombian capital of Bogotá, growing up in a dysfunctional family with economic problems. He suffered a burn on his leg at an early age, which eventually earned him the name "Johnny the Leper". He left school at the age of 13 and became the leader of a gang who operated in the localities of Fontibón and Kennedy during the 1990s. At the time, it was the most feared band in Bogotá. Torres was linked to several murders and rapes that occurred in various neighborhoods.

As the gang's leader, he murdered several people using firearms, knives and machetes. The group then expanded and settled in several of the city's territories. With this, it displaced other criminal organizations and monopolized the micro-trafficking of drugs. In view of all the events, the Colombian authorities investigated thoroughly and established strategies to capture the gang's members. They managed to track down where Moreno Torres' partner lived and waited at the site for him to arrive. Once identified, he was immediately captured.

Torres was then imprisoned in La Modelo prison in Bogotá, where he was later murdered. It is believed that several inmates killed him using a firearm, shooting him 12 times. Other versions suggest that in addition to being shot, he was also beaten and stabbed by sharp objects.

== Crimes ==
Moreno Torres was officially linked to the deaths of 4 people, although it is believed that he committed between 10 and 20 murders.

All of the murders were violent and executed with vehemence. One of the victims, Omar Cepeda Rendón, was executed with a firearm, later dismembered and incinerated, and his remains finally scattered on a street in Kennedy.

== See also ==
- List of serial killers in Colombia
