= Cristopher Chávez Cuellar =

Colombian serial killer

- Born: 1973 (age 52–53); Puerto Leguízamo, Putumayo Department, Colombia
- Other name: "The Soulless"
- Conviction: Murder
- Penalty: 40 years imprisonment

Details
- Victims: 6–15+
- Span of crimes: 1990s–2015
- Country: Colombia
- States: Huila, Tolima, Caquetá
- Date apprehended: February 2015
- Imprisoned at: Cómbita Prison

Cristopher Chávez Cuellar (born 1973), known as The Soulless, is a Colombian serial killer responsible for killing a taxi driver, a woman in Ibagué and 4 minors in 2015. The police believe that he has killed at least 15 people in total.

In November 2015, he was sentenced to 40 years imprisonment for the killing of the Vanegas brothers.

== Crimes ==
He began his criminal activity in Tolima at the end of 1990s, when Cuellar was 25 years old. Since then, it is known that one of his victims was a woman whom he met in Huila and later kidnapped, raped and butchered. Because of this act, he was sought after by police, managing to evade his capture and continuing his criminal activities, moving to Ibagué. From 1998 to 2004, he carried out crimes with extreme cruelty. The police continued with the search and he was eventually captured in Ibagué, being sentenced to 40 years imprisonment. Despite his capture, he was released for good behavior.

Another murder of which he was accused occurred in Neiva. The victim was Juan Carlos Cuenca Charry, who was killed by Cuellar and his brother in 1998, on the Neiva-Campoalegre route. Because of this, he was captured and prosecuted for various crimes, including aggravated homicide, aggravated robbery and illegal possession of weapons. Cuellar was sentenced to 44 years imprisonment, but was released for having completed a minimum of years.

It is also known that Cuellar attempted to kill a gas station manager in 2015, in Florencia. His last recorded crime occurred in that same year, in Caquetá, on February 4, 2015. Cuellar murdered 4 underage children, a crime that shocked the entire nation. It is believed that the reason behind the killings was for land that the murderer couldn't take due to the parents' refusal. From the massacre, there was a surviving brother whom, faced with the situation, managed to escape to a family member, who later informed a military base about what had happened.

In that same month, Cuellar was captured and detained in the Las Heliconias Prison, however, he managed to escape after receiving a chisel in his cell, utilizing the sleeping guard's inactivity as an opportune moment. Faced with this, the authorities initially offered a reward of 10,000,000 pesos, before quintupling it to 50,000,000. Eventually, Cuellar was captured that same day in Curillo, after a special operation commanded by 200 National Police personnel that covered areas of the country such as Caquetá, Putumayo, Huila and Cauca. After this, Cuellar was transferred to one of the most secure prisons in Colombia and the whole of Latin America - the Cómbita Prison.

== Imprisonment ==
On November 20, 2015, Cristopher Chávez Cuellar, together with Genderson Carrillo Ordóñez, was sentenced to 40 years imprisonment for the murder of the Vanegas brothers.

== See also ==
- List of serial killers in Colombia
- List of serial killers by number of victims
