= National Penitentiary Institute =

National Penitentiary Institute may refer to:

- Federal Penitentiary Service of Argentina (Servicio Penitenciario Federal, SPF)
- National Penitentiary Institute of Peru (Instituto Nacional Penitenciario, INPE)
- National Penitentiary and Prison Institute of Colombia (Instituto Nacional Penitenciario y Carcelario, INPEC)
- For other prison systems, see Category: Prison and correctional agencies
