= Juan Carlos Villa =

Colombian serial killer (born 1981)

- Born: Juan Carlos Villa Cardona; 1981 (age 44–45); Risaralda, Colombia
- Penalty: 45 years

Details
- Victims: 11
- Span of crimes: 2012–2023
- Country: Colombia
- Date apprehended: 27 September 2023

Juan Carlos Villa Cardona (born 1981) is a Colombian serial killer. He confessed to being responsible for the death of 11 people: 10 older adults and one minor; the last three murders were perpetrated by Juan Carlos and his brother, José Alfredo Villa, who also accepted his participation in several crimes. All the murders were committed between 2012 and 2023, in depopulated areas of the Risaralda Department.

The authorities declared him a "serial killer", his modus operandi consisted of posing as a person with a disability to gain their trust and then murder them with knives. Most of the victims had wounds on the back of the thorax. At the time of his capture, he accepted without regret the direct participation in all the murders, one of the psychological and behavioral characteristics of a serial killer.

== Murders ==
The first murders occurred in March 2012. The bodies of Francisco Javier Gaviria Valencia and Fanny Ortiz Cruz were found in a sidewalk located in the municipality of Marsella. The authorities indicated that Villa and his father perpetrated the murders, in addition to stealing money from one of the older adults. In 2013, he killed a cheese merchant in Pereira, on a trail located between the neighborhoods of Kennedy and Comuneros de Dosquebradas. In October 2021, he did the same with 66-year-old Holmes Giraldo Restrepo, whom he attacked in a room in the Llano Grande Alto neighborhood of Pereira. In May 2023 he murdered Henry López Giraldo in complicity with his brother José Alfredo Villa. They tried to steal a copper cable from López Giraldo. In August of that same year, Villa perpetrated 4 other murders, a body of one of his victims was found on the El Espinazo farm, in the El Santuario municipality. The last homicide was recorded on 23 September, on a farm in Dosquebradas.

== Modus operandi ==
The modus operandi consisted of gaining the trust of the people with whom Villa interacted, specifically in the municipalities of Pereira, Dosquebradas, Santa Rosa de Cabal, Marsella and Santuario, places where he moved constantly. He presented himself in these places as a person with a disability with the aim of collecting information to later commit robberies and murders. After his capture, he confessed to being responsible for the 11 murders and his brother declared that he directly participated in 2 homicides. According to authorities, it is likely that they have committed many other murders.

== Imprisonment ==
Villa was arrested on 27 September 2023. On 20 March 2024, he was sentenced to 45 years imprisonment.

== See also ==
- List of serial killers in Colombia
