= José William Aranguren =

Colombian criminal, kidnapper, sex offender and serial killer

- Born: March 5, 1935; Rovira, Colombia
- Died: March 17, 1964 (aged 29); Rosacruz, Venadillo, Colombia
- Cause of death: Killed by law enforcement
- Other names: "Desquite"; William Ángel Aranguren

Details
- Victims: 115
- Span of crimes: 1956–1964
- Country: Colombia
- States: Caldas, Cundinamarca, Tolima
- Date apprehended: Killed during apprehension

José William Aranguren (March 5, 1935 – March 17, 1964), also known as William Ángel Aranguren, was a Colombian criminal, bandit, sex offender and a serial killer. He is known for a wave of ambushes, kidnappings and murders committed during and after the 1950s, the date when he is believed to have started his criminal activities after ambushing a truck from a tobacco company with his fellow gang members.

He was directly responsible for the murders of 39 people in the village of La Italia, in Victoría. However, many newspapers and magazines of the time reported that he was responsible for more. His modus operandi consisted of ambushes on sidewalks, estates and highways, where he kidnapped and murdered law enforcement officials (such as soldiers and policemen), civilians, peasants and even minors. He also sexually assaulted female victims and committed thefts whenever he could.

At the time, he was known by the alias Desquite, because he exacted revenge for the murders of his father and brother, as well as suffering from the dispossession of his property. In the words of famous journalist Gonzalo Arango, Aranguren was "an assassin who killed simply to kill."

== Crime spree ==
Aranguren's first recorded criminal activity was in 1956, when he ambushed a truck from a tobacco company called 'Compañía Colombiana de Tabaco'. During the robbery, four crew members were killed, with Aranguren stealing their money. As a result, from this act, he was sentenced to 23 years imprisonment and was incarcerated in the Picota Central Penitentiary, where he managed to escape from within a year.

Once he escaped, Aranguren organized a gang in 1960. By mid-1961, he carried out an assault in Venadillo, where he murdered two peasants on a farm. In April, he launched another assault on a new hacienda called 'La Argentina', where he murdered 20 peasants. The news generated great consternation at the time, so much that this event was considered a massacre against the peasant populus. Not long after, Aranguren repeated the act on another hacienda very close to Pulí, where he murdered another seven peasants. The last attack of that year occurred on December 4, where four more peasants perished.

News of Aranguren's brutality spread, and in April 1962, he murdered several members of the security forces: in this case, a non-commissioned officer and four soldiers, aided by members of other gangs. By the middle of that year, he again murdered a farmer in Líbano, whom he beheaded. In December, after confronting and surrounding a police checkpoint in Mariquita, Aranguren murdered the four policemen assigned to the area.

As time passed and his crimes increased, Aranguren's modus operandi also evolved. On January 22, 1963, he once broke into a hacienda called Calmonte, from where he kidnapped two minors. He demanded a ransom from the relatives amounting to 5,000 pesos, but cancelled it and eventually beheaded his hostages. On February 13, he ambushed a bus where several people were being transported. From this accident, he killed one person, raped a woman, wounded five people and kidnapped three others, whose further fate is unclear. Only five days later, he attacked again in Honda, assaulting and beheading four farmers. On August 5, he and his posse ambushed a bus, truck and two dump trucks travelling along the Victoría-Marquetalia route, during which 39 people were killed and beheaded, as well as 250,000 pesos stolen. On September 2, he murdered another nine peasants in Las Damas. Finally, in December, Aranguren murdered eight more people: three adults and five minors.

In early 1964, Aranguren faced a Colombian army patrol, ending the life of a soldier. The last official known information of a crime he had committed occurred on March 12, 1964, in a farm known as El Volcán. According to the information, Aranguren kidnapped a child, killing him in a particularly cruel manner by piercing his heart with a knife and later dismembering the corpse in eight pieces, which he then buried in a mass grave.

== Death ==
Aranguren was located on a farm located in the village of Rosacruz, Venadillo on March 17, 1964. Colombian army commandos and police were alerted from an anonymous tipster, and quickly prepared to enter the premises after verifying that it was indeed the suspect.

Led by soldiers, the assault team warned Aranguren that they would not let him escape. He was then killed. After this, the entire Colombian army repeatedly threw grenades at the farm, in order to prevent any other associate of Aranguren from escaping alive. The operators were later rescued by helicopter, after transporting the now-deceased criminal's remains.

According to investigations from the time, Aranguren was not alone in the farm at the time of his death. He was accompanied by three accomplices: Alfonso "Pata de Chivo" Parra, Gustavo "Veneno" Ávila and Alberto "Peligro" López, all of whom were armed. Investigators determined that Aranguren carried with him a 7mm rifle with 96 cartridges and a long .38 caliber revolver with 7 cartridges; Ávila also had a rifle with 50 cartridges; Parra carried a Cristóbal Kiraly M2 Carbine with 423 bullets, and López with 1940-model rifle with 110 cartridges and a frag grenade imported from America.

== See also ==
- List of serial killers in Colombia

== Bibliography ==
- Magazine of the National Police, edition 104, year 1964.
- Colombian Academy of Police History - Historical Notebook No. 17 of 2011, pages 148 to 156.
