= Yadira Narváez =

Colombian serial killer

- Born: Yadira Narváez Marín; 1985 (age 40–41); Florencia, Caquetá, Colombia
- Other names: "The Queen of Scopolamine" "La Burundanguera"
- Conviction: Murder
- Penalty: 100 years imprisonment

Details
- Victims: 5–6+
- Span of crimes: August – December 2011
- Country: Colombia
- States: Caquetá (convicted); Tolima, Putumayo, Huila (confessed)
- Date apprehended: December 26, 2011
- Imprisoned at: Rivera Prison

Yadira Narváez Marín (born 1985) is a Colombian serial killer. She is known as The Queen of Scopolamine and La Burundanguera.

== Biography ==
Yadira Narváez Marín was born in 1985 in Florencia, but was raised by her parents in Rivera, along with her two brothers. Narváez was a businesswoman and owned a farm in the Caquetá Department, where she lived with her husband and daughter. Based in Florencia, she dedicated herself to her work and business, but at some point in her life, she had a relationship with a woman, who would later give her up to the authorities for the murders. Motivated by money and ambition, she decided to work with a group of people in order to obtain money through robberies, which is why she began stalking adults. Narváez used a type of pesticide called Carbofuran, commonly known as "Furadan", which is highly toxic for humans. The substance was mixed with alcoholic beverages, so the victims would die very quickly and silently.

Narváez committed all the crimes in 2011, between the months of August and December. It is believed that she eventually killed between 5 and 6 men using this method, although, according to her, there were more victims amassing a "considerable amount". In addition, murders not only occurred in Caquetá, but also in Tolima, Putumayo and Huila. She was eventually captured in the transport terminal of Neiva.

Following these events, she was nicknamed by the authorities as The Queen of Scopolamine, and is serving her sentence in the Rivera prison.

== See also ==
- List of serial killers in Colombia
