= Fredy Armando Valencia =

Colombian rapist and serial killer

- Born: Fredy Armando Valencia Vargas; 1982 (age 43–44); Bogotá, Colombia
- Other name: "The Monster of Monserrate"
- Conviction: Murder
- Penalty: 36 years imprisonment

Details
- Victims: 8–9+
- Span of crimes: 2012–2014
- Country: Colombia
- State: Bogotá
- Date apprehended: November 30, 2015
- Imprisoned at: La Picota Prison

Fredy Armando Valencia Vargas (born 1982), known as The Monster of Monserrate, is a Colombian rapist and serial killer. He was connected to the deaths of between 8 and 9 women, however, he confessed to killing approximately 100 women. According to his own confessions, he sexually abused his victims before and after he killed them.

According to Carlos Valdés, the then director of the National Institute of Legal Medicine and Forensic Sciences, Fredy Valencia has antisocial personality disorder.

He is currently incarcerated in La Picota Prison. Valencia was initially sentenced to 9 years, then increased to 18, and finally, a defining sentence of 36 years was established.

== Biography ==
Fredy Armando Valencia Vargas was born in the Colombian capital of Bogotá. He lived for many years in the Kennedy locality, southwest from Bogotá, where at an early age he showed signs of violence, which is why he was sent to a specialized martial arts school. Valencia studied at the Rafael Uribe District Educational Institution, where he obtained a bachelor's degree, and then entered a university where he studied 4 semesters of Industrial Engineering, a career he later abandoned completely due to excessive drug use. Valencia left his home and became homeless. He settled on Monserrate, building a small house on one of the Eastern Hills. When settled, he began traveling to different areas, such as El Bronx and El Cartucho, among others, highly dangerous places where drugs were frequently trafficked, and thus was an epicenter for addicts. In those areas, he lured female drug addicts with offers of food and shelter, and then murdered them.

According to several people who knew Valencia, he used various types of drugs, including cocaine and heroin, but nevertheless dressed neatly and behaved calmly.

== Crimes ==
The authorities nicknamed him the "Monster of Monserrate", because it was in that area that he committed the murders between 2012 and 2014. He sexually assaulted his victims and later strangled them.

According to his own confessions, on several occasions he committed acts of necrophilia, since "when [he] wanted to, [he] looked for them, dug them up and accessed them again." Valencia also confessed that he buried the corpses in a strategic way, so that no one would find out about the women's disappearances. Colombian police tied him to the deaths of nine women, but according to Valencia, he has killed upwards of 100, including minors.

He is considered one of the "most prolific serial murderers in Bogotá in recent years."

== See also ==
- List of serial killers in Colombia
