= María Concepción Ladino =

Colombian fraudster and serial killer

- Born: 1960s Bogotá, Colombia
- Other name: "The Killer Witch"
- Convictions: Fraud, Murder
- Penalty: 40 years imprisonment

Details
- Victims: 6
- Span of crimes: 1994–1998
- Country: Colombia
- States: Bogotá, Santander
- Date apprehended: 1999
- Imprisoned at: El Buen Pastor Prison

María Concepción Ladino (born in the 1960s), known as The Killer Witch, is a Colombian fraudster and serial killer. She murdered 6 people, both men and women, in the 1990s.

She earned people's trust as she performed sorcery in order to offer protection, improve their quality of life, and increase the profits of their businesses. At the time of her capture, she tried to commit suicide. Ladino then declared herself mentally ill, but despite this, she was convicted and sentenced to 40 years imprisonment at El Buen Pastor Prison in Bogotá.

Concepción Ladino's story appeared on the Discovery Channel series, Instinto Asesino. She appeared in the second-season episode titled "The Killer Witch," which aired on February 7, 2011.

== Biography ==
Concepción Ladino was born and raised in the city of Bogotá. Commonly known as "La Hermana María" or "Doña Conchita", she lived in Fontibón, in an apartment leased by Carlos Montaña, owner of the residence. From the beginning, María offered Carlos her services as a curandera, since, according to her, he was sick and emaciated. Her services consisted of a series of shots and drinks stored in jars, in addition to special bathrooms, which were looked after by her three children. On October 13, 1994, she perpetrated what would be her first murder, after offering a series of drinks to Carlos in his room. The victim agreed to these and after a while, he remained alone in the room until his wife became aware of the situation. However, Ladino held several spiritual sessions for his health. After this, Carlos tried to flee but one of the children had already called the authorities, who, in the end, did not report the abduction.

After these events, Ladino moved to another place in Fontibón. There, she met a gentleman who owned two cars, offering her services in exchange for 1,500,000 pesos. However, it didn't work out, so she asked Nebardo Adalberto Guevara Torres, from Río Cáqueza, to do something for her in order to "change the physical and thus protect it from their enemies". Eventually, Torres disappeared, which is why his wife filed a complaint with the authorities against Concepción Ladino, who was detained for fraud, but released for lack of evidence.

She then moved to Bucaramanga, calling herself "La Hermana María". By the end of the 1990s, she met Heidy Forero, a woman with financial problems, whom Ladino offered to help. Forero was then taken in her car to a desolate place, drugged with a sleeping pill and burned after the car was set on fire. As part of a strategy to evade the police, Ladino moved back to Bogotá, this time to a ranch where she met a woman with some saved money. The victim was given scopolamine, and although it didn't kill her, Ladino threatened to finish the job if she dared say anything. After that, she moved to the Ciudad Jardín neighborhood, where she subsequently deceived, murdered and robbed an elderly couple of 15,000,000 pesos. The last victims of Concepción Ladino were 3 sisters, who were robbed of 13,000,000 by trickery. She assured them that the money would be used to save her mother from a cancerous tumor in her neck, but the woman died and the fraudster stole the money. Given this, Ladino then called for the 3 sisters to the outskirts of Bogotá under the pretence of returning the money, but instead she murdered them using large stones, with the help of two other people.

== Condemnation ==
María Concepción Ladino was captured by the Attorney General's Office in 1999, after an extensive search lasting several months. She was sentenced to 40 years imprisonment, with the sentence being handed down by a specialized court in Bogotá. Ladino was convicted of murdering 6 people, including the 3 sisters, and for cheating more than 20 people.

== See also ==
- List of serial killers in Colombia
