= Rubén Villalobos Herrera =

Colombian rapist and serial killer

- Born: 1983 (age 42–43); Villavicencio, Meta Department, Colombia
- Other name: "The Black Canes Monster"
- Conviction: Murder
- Penalty: Awaiting sentencing

Details
- Victims: 9
- Span of crimes: 2012–2017
- Country: Colombia
- State: Meta

Rubén Villalobos Herrera (born 1983), known as The Black Canes Monster, is a Colombian serial killer and rapist.

== Rapes and murders ==
Herrera committed the rapes and murders between 2012 and 2017, in a sector known as "The Black Canes", located in Villavicencio. All of the victims were randomly selected women, with their ages approximately being between 20 and 70. His modus operandi was to approach women with the excuse of transporting them for free to their homes using his motorcycle, which was the average means of transportation for the company he worked for. Herrera would then deviate from the route with the women on board and drove them to distant and isolated places, such as potreros. There, he raped and then killed them using stones, before continuing to rape the victims' bodies.

Although 11 murders were reported, two of his potential victims managed to escape.

== Trial and conviction ==
Villalobos Herrera was captured by officials of the Office of the Attorney General of Colombia and the Sijin in Covisán, Meta Department. At first, he was found guilty of femicide, attempted murder and violation of a corpse, and subsequently sent to prison, where he is currently awaiting the final sentence, ranging from 41 to 50 years imprisonment.

== See also ==
- List of serial killers in Colombia
