= María del Pilar Pérez =

Imprisoned Chilean architect

- Born: María del Pilar Pérez López; 21 December 1951 (age 74); Providencia, Santiago, Chile
- Other name: The Quintrala of Seminario
- Occupation: Architect
- Spouse: Francisco Zamorano (m. 1976; sep. 1999)
- Children: 2
- Status: Imprisoned
- Motive: Jealousy, inheritance
- Penalty: Life in prison with possibility of parole after 40 years

Details
- Victims: 3
- Date: 23 July 2008; 23 November 2008 (third murder)
- Imprisoned at: Female prison of San Joaquín

María del Pilar Pérez López (born 21 December 1951) is a Chilean architect currently imprisoned for the triple murder of her husband, fellow architect Francisco Zamorano Marfull, his at-the-time boyfriend, technological medic Héctor Arévalo Olivero, and her nephew-in-law Diego Schmidt-Hebbel Niehaus, between April and November 2008, all committed through the use of hitman José Ruz Rodríguez. Due to these actions, she is popularly known as "The Quintrala of Seminario" (in Spanish: La Quintrala de Seminario), in reference to Seminario street in Providencia, where her residence and various properties belonging to the Pérez-López family were, along with the location of the first two murders. Despite her multiple convictions, she still pronounces her innocence.

== Biography ==
Pilar Pérez López was born in Providencia, a commune of Santiago, to parents José Pérez Pérez, a Spanish national from Chaguazoso who fled his native country to evade military service during World War I and owner of a well-known bakery in the same commune, and María Aurelia López Castaño, an Argentine national described by inspector Humberto Díaz as an authoritarian and matriarchal woman, being the eldest daughter of this marriage. She has two younger sisters, Gloria and Magdalena. According to her mother, she suffered from anger management problems in her childhood, several times lashing out at people around her, and that she had stolen money on several previous occasions.

On 3 March 1976, María del Pilar Pérez López, 26 years old at the time, married Francisco Pelayo Elías Zamorano Marfull, 24 years old at the time. They had a son, Juan José, and a daughter, María Rocío.

During the 1990s, José Pérez began to show symptoms of Alzheimer's, and intended that Zamorano would be the new owner of his bakery when he died, but changed his mind after Zamorano revealed himself as a homosexual man and separated from Pilar Pérez. During the last years of his life, there were several conflicts over Pérez's inheritance, but she ultimately inherited a large part of her father's resources upon her father's death, including her Seminario 95 properties (where her mother resided), and Seminario 97 (where the rest of her family lived).

Pérez's family has described Pilar as a troubled and violent woman, and her mother testified that she joked about the number of hit men in United States after a trip to New York. On 7 July 2007, she had a physical assault against Montserrat Hernando Berríos, her daughter-in-law, being the wife of her son Juan José Pérez.

=== Murders ===
Supposedly, she used the money from her father's inheritance to hire José Mario Ruz Rodríguez as a hitman, giving him a map of her to-be victims' house, marking where the victims slept and where they kept their money.

On 23 July 2008, José Ruz shot and killed the couple made up of Francisco Zamorano Marfull and Héctor Rodrigo Arévalo Olivero. On 6 November, Pérez hired Ruz again, this time instructing him to enter the family residence of Pérez's relatives with the intention of murdering them all so that she could collect her father's entire inheritance. On 23 November, he tried to carry out this plan, but only managed to shoot Diego Schmidt-Hebbel Niehaus, the boyfriend of Belén Molina, Pérez López's niece, before being found by the rest of the family and escaping from them.

=== Investigation and legal proceedings ===
Both Ruz and Pérez were caught by the Chilean Investigative Police within the same month given to a witness who captured Ruz's license plate, who confessed to all the facts after being discovered. After being arrested, Pérez had a suicide attempt and sent a letter to her daughter, asking her to offer Ruz money in exchange for modifying her version of the events that occurred to incriminate her brother-in-law Agustín Molina.

The trial against Pilar Pérez began on 23 September 2010, using around 100 witnesses and exhibiting around 60 pieces of evidence before the jury. In total, Pérez was charged individually with serious injuries against Montserrat Hernando, and was accused along with José Ruz of:

- parricide against Francisco Zamorano Marfull
- qualified homicide against Héctor Rodrigo Arévalo Olivero
- robbery with homicide against Diego Schmidt-Hebbel Niehaus
- homicide attempt against María Belén Molina Pérez, María Aurelia López Castaño, Gloria Pérez López and Agustín Molina Mirabel

Despite pleading not guilty the day before, on 19 January 2011, she was found guilty, and, together with her accomplice, sentenced to life imprisonment with the possibility of parole after 40 years in prison, the highest penalty allowed in the Chilean justice system.

== Aftermath ==
Pérez's then-residence, Seminario 95 (which suffered a house fire in 2012), was sold to compensate the family of those affected. It is currently owned by Inversiones Concepción S.A. On the other side of the street, Seminario 97, the home where Schmidt-Hebbel was murdered, has been replaced by various offices and a pharmacy.

Currently, she is serving her sentence in the women's prison of San Joaquín, sharing a pavilion with Marcela Mardones, former partner of ex-FPMR militant Raúl Escobar Poblete, who was sentenced to 18 years in prison for participating in the assassination of Jaime Guzmán. Inside prison, she was part of the organizing committee for the visit that Pope Francis had to this prison during his 2018 visit to Chile. Supposedly, she has feuded multiple times with Jeannette Hernandez, who was convicted of the 2009 murder of one of her children.

To this day, she maintains her total innocence in the face of the charges brought against her. In July 2022, Pérez and her lawyer Pablo Armijo asked the Supreme Court to quash Pérez's sentence and launched the YouTube channel "Pilar's voice", where both share their version of the events that occurred.

The 2023 TV series Alma negra (Black soul) is inspired by her case.
