= Luis Garavito =

Colombian serial killer and sex offender (1957–2023)

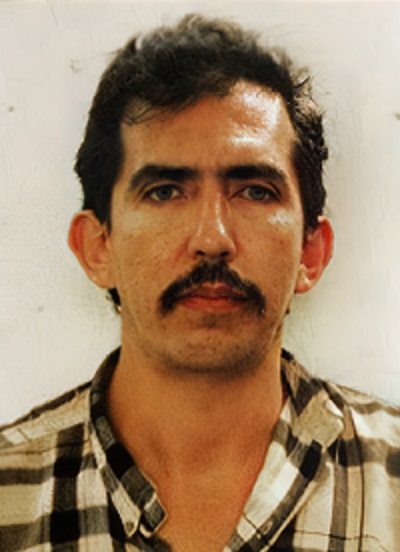
- Mugshot taken in April 1999 by the Colombian National Police
- Born: Luis Alfredo Garavito Cubillos; 25 January 1957; Génova, Quindío, Colombia
- Died: 12 October 2023 (aged 66); Valledupar, Colombia
- Other names: The Beast; Goofy; Conflict; Bonifacio Morera Lizcano
- Criminal charges: First-degree murder; Rape; Sexual violence
- Penalty: 1,853 years and 9 days' imprisonment (2001); 835 years' imprisonment (2000); 22 years' imprisonment in Ecuador (2007)

Details
- Victims: 193+ (221, if 2003 confession is to be believed; 142 convicted)
- Span of crimes: 1992–1999
- Country: Colombia; Ecuador; Venezuela
- States: Valle del Cauca, Boyacá, Meta, Quindío, Risaralda, Cundinamarca, Nariño, Huila, Caquetá, Antioquia and Caldas, Chone
- Weapons: Knife, blade, rope, machete
- Date apprehended: 22 April 1999
- Imprisoned at: EPAMS Valledupar – La Tramacúa

Luis Alfredo Garavito Cubillos (25 January 1957 – 12 October 2023), also known as La Bestia ("The Beast") or Tribilín ("Goofy"), was a Colombian serial killer and sex offender who sexually assaulted 200 victims before murdering 193 victims, mostly young men and boys from 1992 to 1999 in western Colombia.

Beginning a series of torture-rapes on minors aged 6 to 16 in the autumn of 1980, Garavito was estimated to have raped and tortured a minimum of 200 minors, before committing the rape, torture, mutilation, and murder of an additional 189 minors in Colombia from 4 October 1992 to 21 April 1999, and a further four murders in Ecuador during the summer of 1998.

Apprehended on 22 April 1999 for the attempted rape of 12-year-old John Iván Sabogal, Garavito was held under suspicion for several months until he confessed on 28 October 1999. The court ruled that Garavito should serve sentences totalling 1,853 years and 9 days in prison. Between his Colombian and Ecuadorian victims, Garavito is confirmed to have murdered at least 193 minors in total, making him the most prolific serial killer and child molester in modern history. If his 2003 confession is to be believed, his murders of 23 minors and 5 adults would raise his murder victim count to 221.

== Early life ==
Garavito and his siblings were neglected; he described his father as a "womanizer" and his parents fought frequently. He claimed he "had the misfortune of being in a family that spent its time arguing, fighting, and throwing words of great calibre", and that his father physically abused his family. Consequently, Garavito and his siblings hid from their father.

Garavito claimed that his strict father only interacted with him for work-related purposes and errands, and that his father frequently berated him. Attending Simón Bolívar School in Ceilán, he was teased often and ridiculed by other children, and struggled to learn most subjects. Nicknamed "Garabato". Garavito was reportedly bullied by his classmates and thus preferred being alone at recess.

Around 1968, Garavito was removed by his father from the fifth grade to financially assist their family, limiting his ability to make friends and socialise. In 1969, during a routine vaccination visit that his father had taken him to, Garavito was allegedly sexually molested by the pharmacist-phlebotomist, a devoutly religious man who was also the family's neighbor. The man was also said to have been close to Garavito's father, and is alleged to have sadistically bitten, burned and cut Garavito during the incident; experts and others have questioned the truth of Garavito's claims, however.

Following this first incident of abuse, Garavito allegedly killed and dissected two birds, out of frustration, before reportedly beginning to sexually fondle and inappropriately eye his younger siblings. (Note: Garavito would later insist that his fondling of his siblings was so insignificant that they possibly did not remember it as adults.) Garavito also alleged that he molested a six-year-old boy in 1969. According to family and friends, Garavito became very withdrawn, extremely aggressive and "ready to take revenge on the world."

== Adolescence ==
The family relocated to Trujillo in 1971. He did not disclose the experiences until his arrest for fear and belief his family would not believe him. Soon after arriving in Trujillo, Garavito was shown heterosexual pornography by a neighbor, who mocked Garavito's disgust at the pornography before beating and sexually assaulting him. (Note: Blaming it on the sexual abuse he endured as a youth, Garavito would recall feeling shame at not being able to feel aroused enough by the experience.) Through his family, Garavito began drinking alcohol. (Note: Several of Garavito's family members were alcoholics, with a maternal grandfather dying of cirrhosis in his youth.)

In 1972, he aggressively attempted to initiate sexual relations with local women who rejected his advances. The same year, he was evicted by his mother for attempting to sodomize a 5-year-old boy and again in 1973 after an attempted assault on a 6-year-old boy at a Bogotá train station. The boy screamed and Garavito was briefly detained, explaining he only wanted to "lightly" molest the child in response to an attempted rape charge. Following the latter incident, Garavito claimed he was reprimanded by his father for not choosing a woman to sexually assault instead of a young boy. As a result of their frequent fighting over his pedophilia, he was evicted for the final time for "homosexual behavior." (Note: Garavito later said that the first incident was when he recognized his extreme attraction to male children which was elevated by sadism. The repressive and strained conditions of his upbringing were said by experts to be crucial to his later diagnosis of antisocial personality disorder.)

Garavito started working as an assistant at a compensation fund and later in a chain of stores, and studied marketing, but he was problematic and escalated to physical altercations with clients, co-workers, and bosses. After losing his job, he worked as a street vendor who sold religious icons and as a migrant worker, developing platonic relationships with older women over the course of his adulthood. Garavito began work on a coffee plantation as a youth in Trujillo, first falling in love with a schoolteacher and single mother named Luz Mary Ocampo Orozco, with whom he later attended weekly mass services.

Both of his girlfriends had children, whom Garavito reportedly nurtured as if they were his own, and was a good boyfriend when sober. His companions likewise described him as amicable despite his notably violent temper and occasional drunken states in which he threatened to murder his father. While drunk, Garavito was physically abusive toward his girlfriends, as well as increasingly jealous, controlling, and belittling. As a result, he was often the subject of local scandals and town gossip, facing repeated evictions by female partners in later life.

== Adulthood ==
=== 1970s ===
Garavito suffered symptoms of psychosis, paranoia and depression, and compulsively molested male and female children, developing an almost exclusive preference for pubescent boys. He had depression and suicidal feelings related to his lack of achievement and wanted to start a family, but suffered erectile dysfunction with his female partners when drunk. This caused him extreme grief, and he often ranted about his hatred for his family to them.

Garavito began participating in Alcoholics Anonymous meetings in 1978, converting to the Pentecostal faith and working as a clerk at a store where he met with his first girlfriend Luz Mary. Drifting from his family, he was only close to his older sister, Esther, who avoided him due to his alcoholism. Garavito also conflicted with his younger siblings over their father's favoritism towards them. Relocating to the town of Armenia, he acquired a new job at a local bakery. Garavito frequently visited church services where he would beat his chest during prayer, attending Alcoholics Anonymous meetings and occasionally seeing psychiatrists before ending his day by frequenting Valencia Park to procure the services of child prostitutes.

=== 1980s ===
Garavito's employment at the bakery was terminated after fighting his co-workers; he subsequently attempted suicide. He then sought psychiatric care at the San Juan de Dios hospital and was repeatedly hospitalized throughout the spring of 1980, where he expressed a desire to die over a belief that his life "was worth nothing". He was primarily treated for depression despite evident psychosis and bulimia; he was, however, prescribed antipsychotic medication. Intent on explaining why he was suicidal to the psychiatrist, Garavito stated he "wanted" children, before rephrasing this statement to imply that he simply wanted to start a family.

Garavito later obtained employment in 1980 at a supermarket in Armenia, in Quindio, where he received two-hour lunch breaks on Thursday and Sunday afternoons. He subsequently began a short-lived relationship with a single mother and beautician named Claudia, who he liked. However, Claudia soon left him, as Garavito's modest career apparently could not sustain Claudia's desired spending habits, thus he soothed himself by sexually assaulting street children during his lunch breaks, in neighboring Quimbaya and Calarcá. Garavito noted that, during this time, he felt constant urges to molest children, often while working. In the autumn of 1980, he began carrying razor blades, candles, and lighters to torture his victims.

Following his crimes, he would write his victims' names in a blue notebook and pray for them while ritually pacing his room nude and beating his chest. Garavito also read the Bible every night, attempting to find an explanation in the Book of Psalms for his deviance. Despite this interest in Christianity and Catholicism, Garavito also developed an avid interest in esoteric study, such as astrology and tarot readings, as well as the study of Satanism, after receiving an esoteric book from a friend. He would visit palm readers and other fortune-tellers, before concluding they, too, knew little regarding the occult. Afflicted with bouts of depression and guilt from his crimes, Garavito alleged that he suffered nightmares about his victims and would wake up crying over the children, before laughing at them.

Upon discovering Adolf Hitler's autobiography Mein Kampf, Garavito became very fond of the Nazi leader and even made several connections between both of their lives, such as traumatic childhoods, homosexual experiences and years spent in vagrancy. He thus developed an obsessive admiration of Hitler and the mass graves of the Holocaust, later remarking to investigators that he "liked the concentration camps". On 25 January 1984, his 27th birthday, Garavito was housed under psychiatric care for 33 days following a mental breakdown; he was prescribed antipsychotic medication and referred to psychotherapy for his depression. After obtaining a permit to leave on 28 February, Garavito instead fled to Pereira, Department of Risaralda, where he immediately molested two children in the sector of Getsemani before leaving their photographs with his older sister. When he was publicly identified, he fled the city. Garavito then resumed storing scalpels, candles and razor blades in plastic bags for future victims. Having sexually abused more than a hundred children by this time, Garavito was then briefly detained for stealing jewelry from a friend.

Garavito also developed an obsession with mass murderer Campo Elías Delgado, a self-declared Vietnam veteran, who murdered his own mother (and several others) at a Bogotá restaurant in December 1986. Garavito admired the national attention Delgado received, and wished to emulate him, while he and others watched the headlines on television at a bar. From this point on, Garavito fantasized about acquiring a machine gun and annihilating his father and family before committing suicide. Idolizing certain murderers, Garavito felt that committing suicide following a mass murder of his family would be an ideal way for him to die.

During this period, Garavito dated a single mother, Graciela Zabaleta, who resided near the local psychiatric centres in which he was committed. After introducing himself, Garavito casually suggested that she be his permanent companion. Charmed by his confidence, Zabaleta let Garavito live with her in Pereira, in exchange for providing meals and helping to pay bills in the household. Instead, Garavito was generally absent, yet acted as a protective and fatherly figure over the household. This lead Zabaleta to be wary of his alcoholism, which notably seemed to trigger his scandalous and antisocial behaviour.

After being seen by his friends, Jairo Toro and Ancizar Valencia, drunk and in the company of young boys at local motels, Garavito's social circle subsequently became aware of his pederasty. Despite this, he was not confronted about it, and his friends were largely unaware of the depravity of his actual crimes. Starting in 1988, he began documenting his assaults, keeping trophies from victims in black, cloth suitcases at several females' residences.

=== 1990s ===
Between 1980 and 1992, Garavito raped and tortured an estimated minimum of 200 youths, a period during which he had actively spent five years under psychiatric care, having attempted suicide several times. Wherever Garavito had resided during this time, local reports of child molestation increased substantially.

While operating a ouija board, Garavito alleged that he entered a state of psychosis in which the devil had asked whether he would like to serve him. Answering that he would, the devil responded, saying, "Kill, that with killing many things may come." Attempting to commit his first murder on 1 October 1992 Garavito sought a young boy who had been selling sweets and cigars to passersby. In a "state of drunkenness", he lured the youth—who he planned on bringing to a wooded lot—to the Melia hotel sector in Bolivar, Colombia before being interrupted and beaten by local police, one of whom hit him over the head with a revolver. As Garavito bled, they then stole 1,000 pesos, a watch, and a ring from him before letting him go from a police station.

He began wearing various disguises to evade identification and arrest. Known locally as "Goofy", a generous man who gave to children in Trujillo, locals went out of their way to keep documents for Garavito. For years, Garavito documented his crimes by tickets, receipts, clothes, and identity cards of victims in a black cloth suitcase; Garavito left the suitcase with his sister Esther before giving it to Luz Mary. He also collected their amputated toes, before disposing of them for fear that the Colombian National Police's scent dog team would trace them to him. In June 1996, Garavito complained to Luz Mary of losing his temporary job as a salesman for air fresheners, begging for a place to stay in exchange for food and financial relief. Wary of Garavito for his alcoholism and temper, she took him in briefly with hesitance, Garavito then suffered a hard fall in the Guacamayas neighborhood of Bogotá, breaking his leg in August 1996. Stricken with pain, he resided temporarily with a man before begging his girlfriend, Luz Mary, to let him stay at her residence again. Restricted by having to use crutches, wear a neck brace, and a cast, Garavito resorted to begging on the street for the two months he resided with her.

Garavito provided for the household by paying for meals and other means, such as bringing a television. He remained hostile however, and started a fight with his girlfriend's 15-year-old son for wanting to watch the local news. Luz Mary subsequently evicted Garavito for this and for damaging a gold chain she had gifted Garavito. Later that year on Christmas Day, Luz Mary received a gift from a visiting friend, which prompted an angry, drunken phone call from Garavito who stated that he "didn't like those faggots" visiting as he feared they would steal her generosity from him. After being informed he was no longer welcome, Garavito appeared the next morning shouting obscenities and threats while grabbing at Luz Mary's throat, prompting her and the family to hide at a neighbor's house. After several hours, Garavito left an apology note asking for forgiveness for his "damage" to their household. Nicknamed "Conflict" by locals, Garavito was frequently seen drunk and drifting from town to town as he outwore his welcome, often due to his domestic disputes with co-workers, abuse of his girlfriends, and general inability to behave normally. His erratic behavior reportedly left him unable to develop and maintain close relationships.

Toward the end of Garavito's crime spree, he drifted through western Colombia as a homeless drifter. Weary of murdering minors who he felt were much too easy to lure, Garavito developed plans to commit a mass murder in which he would kidnap several adults and murder them as he attracted the attention of journalists, possibly dying in the frenzy. Garavito was detained for the attempted sexual assault of 12-year-old John Iván Sabogal on 22 April 1999, before the mass murder plans could come to fruition.

== Murders ==
=== In Colombia ===
Garavito began to feel apathy about his sex crimes. On 4 October 1992, he had spotted 13-year-old Juan Carlos walking near a bazaar where he had been drinking. According to Garavito, the reflection of the moonlight in the river had invoked a "strange force" within him, reminding him of his childhood and enraging him. He followed the child, buying synthetic rope and a butcher's knife on the way, before offering him work for 500 or 1,000 pesos. Carlos left the crowded area in Jamundí with Garavito to go to a remote area near the local railroad, where he was later found with his front teeth knocked out, severe cuts to his rectum and throat and his genitals severed. Garavito alleged he blacked out, and wept upon discovering blood on his clothes in the morning. (Note: Garavito would also allege feelings of guilt as he saw the murder of Carlos mentioned in the local newspapers on 7 October 1998.)

On 10 October 1992, Garavito ventured to Trujillo to see his sister Esther. Drinking brandy to subdue his impulses, he began breaking containers in a state of rage after seeing a child pass by, murdering 12-year-old Jhon Alexander Peñaranda on the way to his sister's residence while in Tuluá. He further pursued and murdered youths, collecting their amputated toes. In 1993, Garavito started cutting into his victims' bellies, luring eight youths aged 9 to 11 from a local school to a nearby wooded lot in the La Victoria district. For fear of being traced by bloodhounds, Garavito then discarded their amputated toes before murdering Henry Giovanni García, Marco Aurelio Castaño, Juan David Cárdenas, Jaime Orlando Popayán, and three more unidentified children in southeast Bogotá. He then murdered two additional children in the Meissen neighborhood, before departing for Tuluá, to Pereira, to Quimbaya, then to Tuluá again where he murdered more children, ending his spree in 1993 with the death of 13-year-old Mauricio Monedero Mejía.

In early 1994, Garavito lured a Bogotá youth—estimated to be about 12 years old—who had fallen asleep on the bus. After providing him with brandy, Garavito stripped and bound the child at a secluded ravine spot in a dazed state before noticing a foul odour; he then let go of the child after discovering the source of the odour was a mass grave. Immediately, the child seized the knife, severing Garavito's tendons in his left hand with the weapon before ultimately being overpowered and murdered by Garavito. On 4 February 1994, Garavito lured 13-year-old Jaime Andrés González from the Plaza de Bolívar to a sugarcane field shortly after being expelled from a bar that night for complaining about their food before molesting and murdering him. Encountering a large crucifix, he entered a brief psychosis and heard a voice berating him before burying his knife and praying for forgiveness, retrieving the knife again and returning to his hotel room to chant scripture from the fifty-seventh psalm for several hours until dawn. On 12 January 1997, Garavito murdered an 8-year-old boy, before murdering an additional two minors during this period.

The victims were almost exclusively boys, though Garavito has also been noted by local media to have molested and murdered female victims. In addition to his 172 initial charges of murder, Garavito also confessed to 28 more murders in 2003, of which five were of adults. According to Garavito, he ordered the killings of his adult victims.

=== Abroad ===
Garavito was also said to have operated in Ecuador during the summer of 1998, when he murdered 14-year-old Abel Gustavo Loor Vélez, a local shoe-shiner and paper boy on 20 July 1998 and 12-year-old Jimmy Leonardo Palacios Anchundia in Chone, Ecuador. Both boys were from poor families, and disappeared at noon. Garavito was subsequently spotted at an all-girls' school in Santo Domingo, Ecuador before fleeing Ecuadorian authorities who had been setting up an operation to catch him. There they found two corpses, one of whom was a young girl who had been raped, tortured, murdered, and discarded in similar fashion to that of Garavito's modus operandi. Marked for his thick Colombian accent, locals spotted a foreign drifter begging for money in July and August of that year. In addition, Garavito also stated that he had allegedly committed murder in Venezuela.

== Surviving victims ==
=== William Trujillo ===
In 1979, Garavito, wielding a machete, seized victim 9-year-old William Trujillo Mora (who was interviewed and featured on the Colombian television program Los Informantes) in the Valle del Cauca region as he was about to join other playing children, hugging him and threatening to kill him if he screamed. Trujillo obliged, and he was escorted by Garavito to an abandoned building where he was sexually molested and tortured for 12 hours. When Garavito sensed that someone was near the house, he urged the child to remain silent. When Garavito lost consciousness from drinking, Trujillo managed to escape.

=== Unidentified youth ===
In 1988, Garavito lured an unidentified victim and sexually assaulted him near a restaurant called El Arepazo in the Alto del Río sector of Quindío's Calarcá, a location where several bodies were later found within a 20-meter proximity of one another.

Eleven years later, on 25 January 1999 (Garavito's 42nd birthday), and following a devastating earthquake, authorities found the owner of El Arepazo—which was reduced to rubble—who described Garavito and pointed them in his direction, saying he had known him for many years but avoided him due to his drinking problem and aggressive tendencies.

=== Carlos Alberto ===
In the early 1990s, Garavito approached 10-year-old Carlos Alberto in the Circasia sector of Quindío. Offering him gifts and 200 pesos in exchange for work, Garavito led Carlos to the Alto de la Taza where he amicably spoke with the child. Upon reaching a secluded hill spot, Garavito placed a knife at Carlos' throat before proceeding to bind, rape, and torture him. After doing so, Garavito asked Carlos whether he enjoyed it. Humiliated and fearful of Garavito, Carlos stated that he liked it, prompting Garavito to leave after stating, "See you next week. That's how I like it, that you [also] like it."

=== Brand Bernal ===
Brand Ferney Bernal Álvarez was a 16-year-old youth who worked with his father in the cockfighting business in the 1990s. While Bernal tended to roosters in the cockpit, Garavito took him to a secluded spot by threatening him with a knife. He then proceeded to bind, sexually assault and torture Bernal, with methods ranging from stabbing Bernal seven times with a screwdriver as he raped him, to beating the youth until weak. Bernal broke free from his restraints and fled from Garavito.

== Modus operandi ==
According to Garavito, he primarily targeted children of modest background who were working class, homeless, peasants or orphaned. Garavito would look for children and lure them away by bribing them with small gifts such as money, candy or odd jobs due to a "force" within him. He reportedly molested young boys with "cute faces" and blue or green eyes; Garavito himself boasted of his penchant for "innocent" looking children with "blondish" skin and hair. Born and raised in the largely Spanish-descended Paisa region of Colombia, Garavito knew where to find victims that fit his criteria.

Terrified of the dark, he would approach them in broad daylight in public places ranging from the countryside to crowded city streets. Garavito also drank brandy near school zones on evenings to wait for unwitting victims. He offered easy work for money and wore disguises ranging from a Catholic priest, to a schoolteacher, to an elderly man to more effectively lure victims. To prevent suspicions about his activities from developing, Garavito would change his disguise often.

Once he had the trust of a child, Garavito typically walked to a secluded spot or mass grave site with the victim, encouraging them to talk about their personal life until they were tired and vulnerable, which then made them easy to handle. After sipping about half a bottle of brandy, Garavito bound the children, intimidating them with a knife as he fondled and sometimes masturbated over them. According to Garavito, he made a "pact with the devil" and Satanic rituals were also incorporated into the murders of the children, who were apparent blood sacrifices.

The children were often molested and tortured simultaneously for prolonged periods. Abuse of victims ranged from stabbing in the buttocks, hands, and feet with a screwdriver to having their buttocks flayed with broken blades that Garavito had placed between his fingers. While his victims were alive, Garavito severed their genitals and placed them in their mouth. They were extensively beaten, burned, trampled and often showed deep cuts in the back, stomach and throat. In some cases, they were sexually abused as their intestines poured out of their stomach, impaled through the anus and out of the mouth, and stabbed over one hundred times.

Garavito's climax would occur when he had decapitated the child alive or cut the throat as he finished before leaving the severed genitals in the mouth of the severed head. Necrophilia with the victim's corpse was also occasionally involved in the crimes; sometimes prematurely, as Garavito could only achieve orgasm by beating and stabbing his victims during intercourse. The children's bodies were all found completely naked, bearing bite marks and signs of extensive sodomy. Containers of lubricant were found near the bodies, along with empty bottles of cheap Colombian brandy. Most of the corpses showed signs of prolonged torture.

== Investigation ==
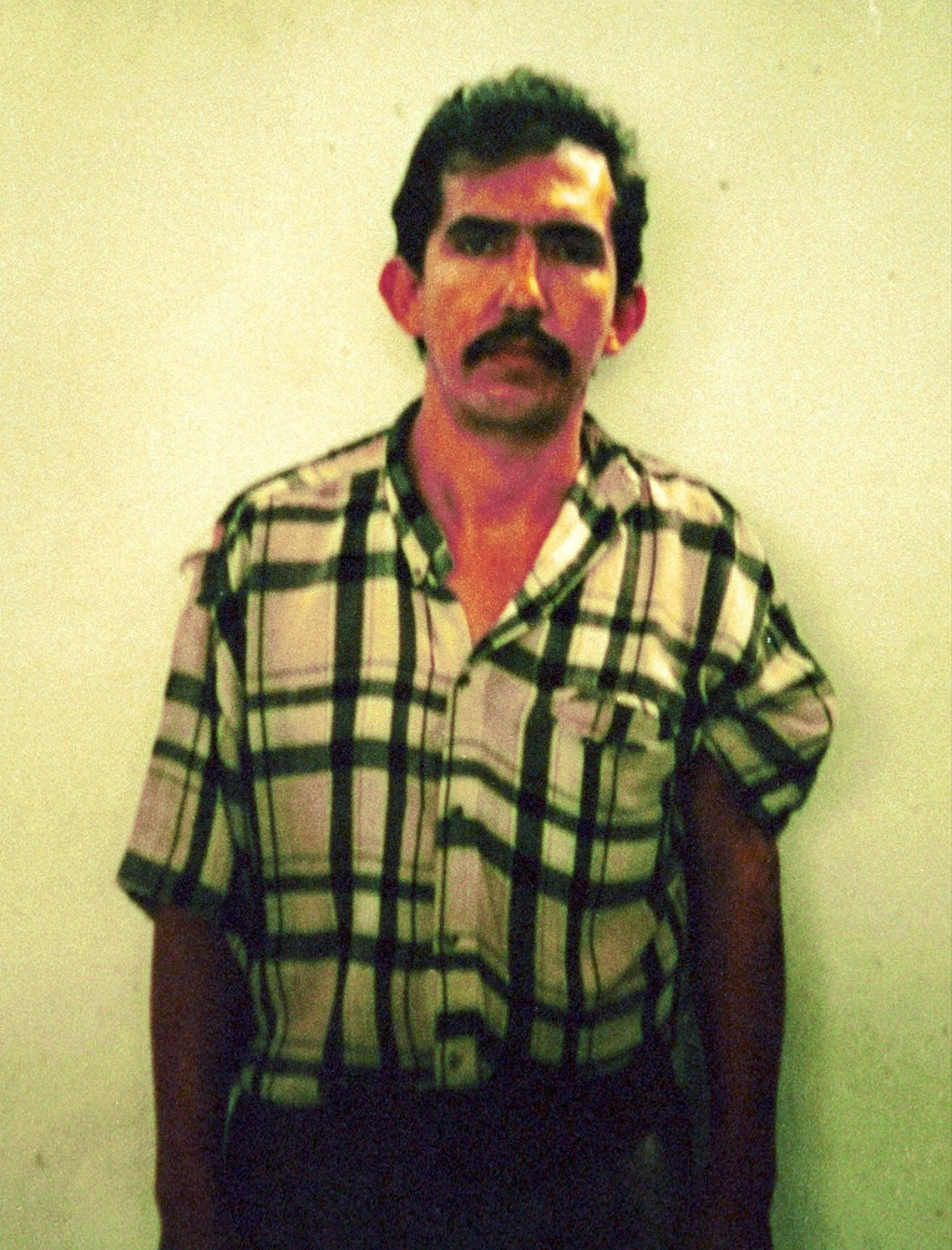
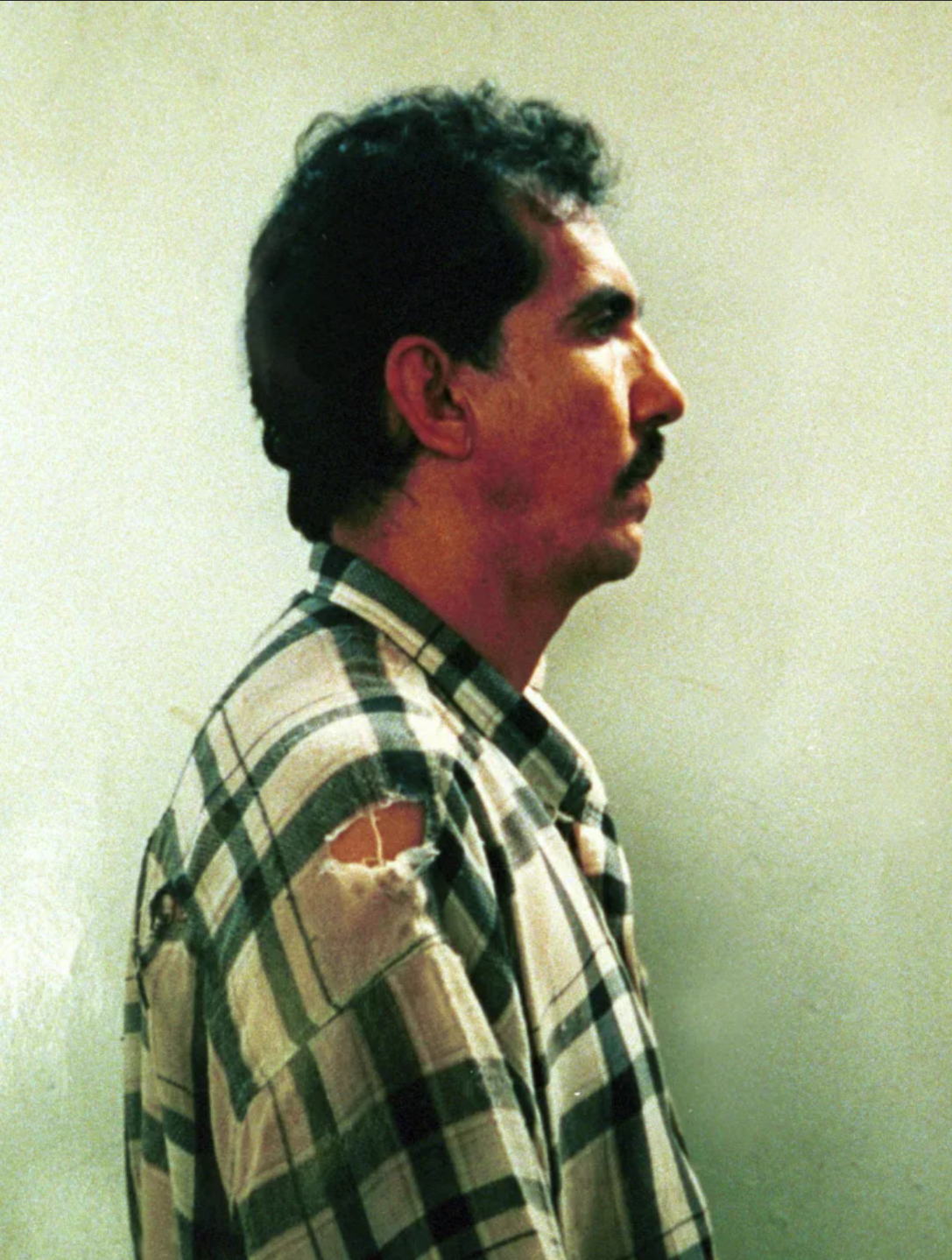
Police mugshots of Garavito taken after his arrest

Beginning in the 1980s, minors from impoverished backgrounds and other groups termed "desechables" ("disposable") began disappearing rapidly from the streets of Colombia. Due to the decades-long civil war, victims were unlikely to be reported missing. A group of children discovered a skeleton in Pereira while playing football on 7 November 1998, yet authorities did not take much notice until 15 November, when mass graves of as many as 36 children were uncovered—almost all of them boys—with signs of binding, sexual assault, and prolonged torture. They discovered a total of 41 children in the department of Risaralda, with 27 children discovered in neighboring Valle del Cauca.

This large number of missing children called for a widespread investigation as these killings were not confined to a specific area. The brutality was so fierce to authorities that they initially hypothesized the killings were performed by a Satanic cult or an international child-trafficking ring. Despite this, the Prosecutor's Office soon determined that it was likely that one man was responsible due to the prevalence of nylon cords and liquor bottle caps found at all of the crime scenes. On 6 February 1999, outside the town of Palmira, the bodies of two naked children were found lying next to each other on a hill near a sugarcane field. The next day, only meters away, they discovered another child's body. All three bodies had their hands bound and bore signs of sexual abuse. The victims' necks were severely cut and bruises were on their backs, genitals, legs and buttocks. The murder weapon was found in the same area as the bodies. Garavito had passed out partially naked on top of a child's corpse while drunk with a cigarette in his left hand, causing the cane field to catch fire. He burned himself severely in the process and left behind his money, burnt glasses, shorts, shoes, and underwear. Receipts and a note containing Graciela Zabaleta's address was also found.

From his glasses, the authorities were able to determine that the murderer was middle-aged and suffered astigmatism in his left eye. His shoes also showed that he walked with a limp and stood 163–167 cm (5 ft 4 in – 5 ft 6 in) tall. They falsely arrested a local sex offender named Pedro Pablo Ramírez García, who was 44 and had a limp in his right foot. As two boys disappeared in Pereira, a young boy had outed García as the man who attempted to assault him. He was kept in jail until more children began to disappear in Bogotá. Meanwhile, Aldemar Durán, the main detective, had begun to suspect Garavito as their wanted killer. Garavito's girlfriend was contacted; she told police that she had not seen him since December. She did, however, give to the police a black cloth suitcase that Garavito had left in her possession, which contained a number of his belongings. These items included pictures of young boys, detailed journals of his murders, tally marks of his victims and bills. This new information led them to Garavito's residence, but the property was vacant. Detectives believed that Garavito was either travelling for work or away attempting to find his next victim. García was released after Durán was able to track down the girlfriend and sister of Garavito.

== Arrest ==
Garavito was picked up by local police just days later on an unrelated charge of attempted rape against 12-year-old John Iván Sabogal. On 22 April 1999, Garavito was drinking brandy in the evening when he encountered Sabogal selling lottery tickets in the city of Villavicencio. Introducing himself as Bonifacio Morera Lizcano, a local politician, Garavito proceeded to seize Sabogal with a knife before threatening the child into silence. Pretending to hug Sabogal, Garavito escorted him into a taxi before forcing him to climb a barbed wire fence that led to a secluded hillside. At this location, Garavito proceeded to bind Sabogal while repeatedly screaming, "Am I a sadist?" He then taunted the child with the blade, shouting various obscenities as he masturbated over him.

A homeless 16-year-old had been close enough to hear the struggle between Garavito and the child. The teen began to curse and throw stones at Garavito. Garavito chased the teenager with his dagger. Both boys fled to the Rosa Blanca farmhouse located on La Coralina Road in Villavicencio, where they were met by a 12-year-old girl. Garavito later reached the farmhouse, aggressively asking the girl for directions. She directed Garavito into the woods, where he became lost. The police were contacted, resulting in a search. Authorities found Garavito walking out of the woods at approximately 7:00 p.m. as they urged angry locals not to get involved in the search. He gave them a false ID and claimed to be the politician Lizcano. Despite this, they suspected the man to be Garavito anyway. On 4 July 1999, their suspicion was confirmed.

For Colombia's Justice Department, Garavito's confession was not enough. Garavito had an eye condition that was rare and only found in men in a particular age group. His glasses were specifically designed for his unique condition. These particular glasses were found at a crime scene. Garavito also left behind bottles of brandy, his underwear and his shoes. DNA was found on the victims along with the other items left behind. Police scheduled the entire jail where Garavito was being detained to get an eye exam, the outcome of which would help police pair the glasses to Garavito. By making it mandatory for all the prisoners, it reduced Garavito's suspicion and kept him from lying about his eyesight. His height of 165 cm (5 ft 5 in) and limp were also crucial in connecting him to the investigators' findings.

While Garavito was out of his cell, detectives took DNA samples from his pillow and living area. The DNA found on the victims was a match to the DNA found in Garavito's cell. Garavito was interrogated for over 12 hours in October; a detective read aloud his crimes until he cried and explained that he would get drunk and look for young boys. He affirmed that he was not homosexual, but was a victim of childhood sexual abuse and would rape young boys before murdering them, confessing to about 140 children in various locations. He was found guilty of 138 of the 172 accounts; the others are ongoing. Garavito was sentenced to 1,853 years and 9 days in prison, the lengthiest sentence in Colombian history. However, Colombian law limits imprisonment to 40 years, and, because Garavito helped police find the victims' bodies, his sentence was further reduced to 22 years.

Garavito served his sentence in a maximum-security prison in Valledupar in the department of El Cesar in Colombia. He was held separately from all other prisoners because it was feared that he would be killed immediately. He could have become eligible for parole in 2023 when he had served three-fifths of his sentence. In 2021, a judge blocked a request to release Garavito early for good behavior on grounds that he had not paid a fine for his victims.

Garavito remained hopeful, having expressed to Colombian senator Carlos Moreno de Caro apparent plans to enter Colombian congress, enter the ministry as a Pentecostal pastor, and marry a woman in the hope that he would be able to help abused children upon his release. Garavito suffered from severe eye cancer and leukemia, which left him blind, weak and fatigued, requiring daily blood transfusions. He spent most of his time making handcuffs, earrings and necklaces in the medical unit of Valledupar's prison. Psychiatrists diagnosed him with antisocial personality disorder and noted narcissistic personality traits.

== Death ==
Garavito died from a heart attack, tuberculosis, leukemia, and eye cancer at a hospital in Valledupar on 12 October 2023. He was 66 years old.

== Public response ==
Many Colombians criticized the possibility of Garavito's early release. In recent years, Colombians have increasingly felt that Garavito's sentence was not sufficient punishment for his crimes. Some argued he deserved either life in prison or the death penalty, neither of which exists in Colombia. Colombian law had no provision or method to impose a sentence longer than what Garavito received, which was seen as a deficiency in the law caused by the failure to address the possibility of a serial killer in Colombian society. The law has since increased the maximum penalty for such crimes to 60 years in prison.

Journalist Guillermo Prieto "Pirry" La Rotta interviewed Garavito for a show which was broadcast on 11 June 2006. Pirry mentioned that, during the interview, Garavito tried to minimize his actions and expressed intent to start a political career to help abused children. Pirry also described Garavito's conditions in prison and commented that due to good behaviour, he could have probably applied for early release within three years.

== See also ==
- List of serial killers in Colombia
- List of serial killers by number of victims
- Pedro López (serial killer)
- Manuel Octavio Bermúdez
