= Jaime Iván Martínez =

Colombian serial killer (born 1971)

- Born: Jaime Iván Martínez Betancur; July 16, 1971 (age 55); Samaná, Caldas, Colombia
- Other names: "The Guarne Killer" "The Monster of the East"
- Conviction: Murder
- Penalty: 42 years imprisonment

Details
- Victims: 4–20+
- Span of crimes: 2005–2016
- Country: Colombia
- States: Antioquia, possibly also Valle del Cauca

Jaime Iván Martínez Betancur (born July 16, 1971), known as The Guarne Killer and The Monster of the East, is a Colombian serial killer. He was responsible for the murder of several people, including the killings of his wife and children. The bodies of the victims were exhumed by specialized personnel of the Attorney General's Office, in cooperation with the Technical Investigation Body (CTI), the Unified Action Groups for Personal Liberty (GAULA) and police dogs, who conducted on-site investigations as part of the procedures.

The Colombian authorities suspect that he has killed between 20 and 25 people for a decade. He was sentenced to 42 years in prison by a specialized court in the Antioquia Department.

== Crimes ==
It is believed that Martínez committed between 20 and 25 murders in the span of a decade. One of the victims was identified as Natalia García Gil, Martínez's former wife, whom was hanged with the use of nylon. The other people were murdered in the same way, including children who were 5 and 7 years respectively, all of whom were killed in November 2015. It was also established that María Gladis Arango was another victim, who disappeared in mid-January 2016 in a village called Hojas Anchas de Guarne, in Guarne. Due to Arango's disappearance, the Colombian authorities imposed an "assurance measure for the crime of enforced disappearance", which allowed for a more detailed follow-up investigation.

According to the investigating authorities, Martínez buried most of his victims in potter's fields at depths of 3 meters, wrapped in several yards of canvas, at a farm where he worked, as a method to forcibly hide the bodies. Nevertheless, according to his own confessions, he claimed that others were buried in two farms near the place where he lived. He also collected objects and personal elements of his victims such as watches, smart phones, jewelry, etc.

He was captured in Guarne by specialized personnel of the CTI, very close to the eastern subregion of Antioquia Department in a farm where he worked as a majordomo and guard, the same place where he committed several of the murders, although it is believed that he has killed others in Medellín and Valle del Cauca Department. Martínez had worked as a farmer, but also held other jobs in surveillance and gardening.

== Condena ==
Martínez was sentenced to 42 years imprisonment for the murder of Arango, Gil and her two children. He was charged with several crimes, including forced disappearance and murder.

== See also ==
- List of serial killers in Colombia
