= Jaime Martínez Tolentino =

Puerto Rican writer (born 1943)

- Born: January 10, 1943 (age 83); Salinas, Puerto Rico
- Alma mater: Complutense University of Madrid
- Occupation: State University of New York's College at Buffalo
- Writing career
- Language: Spanish; English
- Genres: Historical fiction; historical non-fiction; short story
- Subject: Puerto Rican history
- Notable work: See list
- Notable awards: See list

Jaime Martínez Tolentino (born January 10, 1943) is a Puerto Rican writer.

== Early life and education ==
Tolentino was born in Salinas, Puerto Rico on January 10, 1943. At the age of four, Tolentino contracted polio, which left him crippled. In 1951, he and his family emigrated to New York City where he lived until 1966. He attended New York University where he majored in French and French literature, while also studying Spanish literature and German. As an undergraduate he participated actively in the theater.

== Academic career ==
He returned, briefly, to his native Puerto Rico where he was named French professor at The University of Puerto Rico. Then he left for Europe to pursue further studies. In France, he studied French at the Sorbonne, and then he relocated to Spain, where he studied both French and Hispanic literature. He received a PhD in French Literature from the Complutense University of Madrid and then returned to Puerto Rico.

Between 1970 and 1984, Martinez Tolentino taught French at the Mayaguez Campus of the University of Puerto Rico, and he also published three books on French. Also during this period, he published a full-length play, and in 1984, he directed its staged version. One of his short stories was adapted for the stage in Puerto Rico in 1979.

== Writing career ==
It was also during this period that he joined the group of young Puerto Rican writers connected to the literary magazine Mester: the novelist Carmelo Rodríguez Torres, the narrator Wilfredo Ruiz Oliveras, and the poets Luis Cartañá and Sotero Rivera Avilés. Under their influence, Martinez Tolentino began publishing short stories in journals and newspapers, and in 1975, he edited an anthology of their short stories. In 1980, he published his play La imagen del otro, and three years later, an original collection of short stories of the fantastic.

As he continued publishing in Spanish, his interest in Hispanic literature grew. He began taking graduate courses in Spanish and Puerto Rican literature, and then taught Spanish literature at the Inter-American University of Puerto Rico, while still also teaching French at the UPR.

In 1984, Martinez Tolentino resigned from his position as a French professor. He attended Purdue University in Indiana, where he acquired fluency in Portuguese, and then he transferred to the University of Massachusetts Amherst, where he received a second M.A. and a second PhD in Spanish and Latin American literature.

In 1990, he became a Spanish professor at the State University of New York's College at Buffalo, where he continued writing and producing plays. He retired from teaching in 2002.

== Publications ==
=== Fiction – books ===
- Cuentos modernos (Antología). Jaime Martinez Tolentino, Ed., Rio Piedras, Puerto Rico: Editorial Edil, 1975.
- La imagen del otro (Drama). San Juan, Puerto Rico: Instituto de Cultura Puertorriqueña, 1980.
- Cuentos fantásticos. Rio Piedras, Puerto Rico: Editorial de la Universidad de Puerto Rico, 1983.
- Desde el fondo del caracol y otros cuentos taínos. San Juan, Puerto Rico: Instituto de Cultura Puertorriqueña, 1992.
- Cuando cae la noche (relatos) Miami, FL: La Pereza Ediciones, 2013.
- Taino (in Spanish) - Madrid: Ediciones Altera, 2014.
- Thirteen After Midnight -Golden, CO: Reanimus Press, 2016.

=== Fiction – short stories and one-act plays ===
- "La tormenta", Isla Literaria (San Juan, Puerto Rico), 2.8,9,10 (1971): 14.
- "Miedo", Atenea (Mayaguez, Puerto Rico), 7.2 (1971): 93–95.
- "Miedo", Claridad (San Juan, Puerto Rico), January 31, 1976, Supplemento "En Rojo": 14.
- "Miedo", Momento (San Juan, Puerto Rico), September 10, 1977.
- "Su regreso", Inti (Providence, Rhode Island), 12 (1980): 93–97.
- "Una voz que grita adentro, desde el fondo del caracol", Renacimiento (Rio Piedras, Puerto Rico), 1.2 (1981):113–122.
- "La armónica mágica", Gente Joven, (San Juan, Puerto Rico), 4.9 (1982): 60–61.
- "Esos dioses venidos del bagua", Alba de América, 6.3–4 (1990): 427–433.
- "His Return", Top Ten Short Stories of 1993. Owings Mills, MD: American Literary Press, 1993. 29–33.
- "El largo sueño de doña Manuela", Sección “Textos teatrales puertorriqueños,” Boletín del Archivo Nacional de Teatro y Cine del Ateneo Puertorriqueño, Núm. 4 (julio a diciembre de 2005): 237–240.

=== Non-fiction – books ===
- Cuentos modernos (Antología). Jaime Martinez Tolentino, Ed., Rio Piedras, Puerto Rico: Editorial Edil, 1975.
- El Enfermo imaginario (Annotated Edition of Molière’s Le Malade imaginaire), Jaime Martínez-Tolentino, Ed., New York: Plus Ultra Educational Publishers, 1977.
- Normas ortográficas del francés. Boston: Florentia Publishers, 1977.
- Le Verbe français. Rio Piedras, Puerto Rico: Editorial de la Universidad de Puerto Rico, 1979.
- Veinte siglos después del homicidio. By Carmelo Rodríguez Torres. 3rd ed., Jaime Martínez Tolentino, Ed. and Introduction. Rio Piedras, Puerto Rico: Editorial Antillana, 1980. 13–30.
- El indiano en las comedias de Lope de Vega. Acta Columbina 15. Kassel, Germany: Edition Reichenberger, 1991.
- Literatura hispánica e hispanoamericana: Tres autores revalorados: Ricardo Palma, Julián del Casal y Jacinto Benavente. Problemata iberoamericana 5. Kassel, Germany: Edition Reichenberger, 1992.
- La cronología de "Señas de identidad”, de Juan Goytisolo. Problemata Literaria 13. Kassel, Germany: Edition Reichenberger, 1992.
- Caminos (selección poética). By Ramón M. Estrada Vega. Jaime Martínez Tolentino, Ed. and prologue. Problemata Iberoamericana 8. Kassel, Germany: Edition Reichenberger, 1996: xiii–cvii.
- La crítica literaria sobre Alfonsina Storni (1945–1980). Problemata Iberoamericana 10. Kassel, Germany: Edition Reichenberger, 1997.
- Alfonsina Storni: Selección poética. Jaime Martínez Tolentino, Ed. Problemata Iberoamericana 14. Kassel, Germany: Edition Reichenberger, 1998.
- Dos crónicas desconocidas de Lope de Aguirre. Colección Ciencia, Serie Antropología # 340. Madrid: Editorial Fundamentos, 2012.
- The Other Island: A Memoir. Albion, Victoria, Australia 3020: ASJ Publishing, 2013.
- Caminos: Selección poética, 2ª ed. By Ramón M. Estrada Vega. Prologue by Jaime Martínez Tolentino. USA: Create Space, 2013.
- The Other Island: A Memoir. 2nd Ed. The Ardent Writer Press. Accepted for publication.

=== Non-fiction in journals and newspapers ===
- "El prefacio de La comedia humana: Un importante documento literario", Atenea (Mayaguez, Puerto Rico), 5.1–2 (1968): 109–116.
- "Las ciencias biológicas en La Comédie Humaine", Filologia Moderna (Madrid, Spain), 40–41 (November 1970 – February 1971): 111–136.
- "De la cognomología en la literatura", La Torre (Rio Piedras, Puerto Rico), 20.75–76 (1972): 161–165.
- "Traducen al francés una novela puertorriqueña", El Mundo (San Juan, Puerto Rico), December 17, 1978: B-22.
- "Una introducción al cuento fantástico", Renacimiento (Río Piedras, Puerto Rico), 1.1 (1981): 15–29.
- "Nueva novela puertorriqueña es 'sensacional'", La Estrella del Oeste (Mayaguez, Puerto Rico), April 21, 1982): 7.
- "Alfonsina Storni y Gabriela Mistral: La poesía como condena o salvación", Escritura (Caracas, Venezuela), 8.16 (1983): 223–230.
- "Mi mamá me ama, de Emilio Díaz Valcárcel: Cómo se satiriza una visión distorsionada de Puerto Rico", Cuadernos Americanos (Mexico, D.F.), 43.252.1 (1984): 216–226.
- "La familia como fuente de todo mal en El obsceno pájaro de la noche, de José Donoso", Revista de Crítica Literaria Latinoamericana (Lima, Peru), 11.23 (1986): 73–79.
- "La mujer como némesis del hombre en El túnel", Quaderni Ibero-Americani (Turin, Italy), 16.8.61–62 (December 1986, July – December 1987): 193–200.
- "Algunas observaciones sobre la novela Al filo del agua suscitadas por un ensayo de Alfonso Reyes", Escritura (Caracas, Venezuela), 12.23–24 (1987): 123–137.
- "El salón de Guillermo Martínez", La Estrella de Puerto Rico (Mayaguez, Puerto Rico), August 4–10, 1988: 18.
- "Book Review of In Search of the City: Engels, Baudelaire, Rimbaud, By Marc Eli Blanchard. Romance Quarterly 36.1 (1989): 112–113.
- "Machado y el alma española en 'A orillas del Duero'", Escritura, 15.29 (1990): 85–94.
- "Las opiniones literarias de Julián Del Casal", La Torre (Rio Piedras, Puerto Rico) 5.17 (1991): 19–55.
- "La irrealización del paisaje en María y Cumandá", Texto y Contexto (Bogotá, Colombia), 25 (1994): 126–131.
- "El indiano en tres comedias de Lope de Vega", Teatro (Alcalá de Henares, Spain) 5 (2001): 83–96.
- "La génesis de un drama", Boletín del Archivo Nacional de Teatro y Cine del Ateneo Puertorriqueño, Núm. 4 (julio a diciembre de 2005): 42–45.
- "On Writing 1st Chapters; Dean Koontz's Strangers", April 16, 2001: Barnes & Noble.com
- “Mulberry Street,” published in 3 Installments, November 29, 2012 – December 12, 2012, ANGIE’S DIARY
- “Mami…Papi”, an excerpt from “The Other Island,” ANGIE’S DIARY, December 17, 2012
- Christmas in Puerto Rico, ANGIE’S DIARY, December 24, 2012
- “An American Baby,” TUCK MAGAZINE, January 16, 2013
- “The Island Across the River,” published in 8 Installments, from April 27, 2013, to August 5, 2013, Yareah Magazine Issue 36.

== Published Translations ==
- Glannon, Walter. "Unamuno y la metafísica de la ficción." Trans. Jaime Martínez-Tolentino. Estelas, laberintos, nuevas sendas: Unamuno, Valle-Inclán, García Lorca, La Guerra Civil. Ed. Angel Loureiro. Barcelona: Editorial Anthropos, 1988: 95–108.
- Benítez-Rojo, Antonio."Fernando Ortiz and Cubanness: A Post-Modern Perspective." Trans. Jaime Martínez-Tolentino. Cuban Studies 18. Pittsburgh: University of Pittsburgh Press, 1988: 125–132.
- Sommer, Doris. “El Mal de María:(Con)fusión en un romance nacional.” Trans. Jaime Martínez-Tolentino; MLN 104. 2 (March 1989): 439–474.
- Sturges, Hollister. New Art from Puerto Rico/Nuevo Arte de Puerto Rico. Trans. Jaime Martínez-Tolentino. Springfield, Massachusetts: Museum of Fine Arts, 1990.
- Román Capeles, Mervin. "Doña Ana Is Not Here..." Trans. Jaime Martínez-Tolentino. Voices of America. Colorado Springs, CO.:Western Poetry Association, 1992. 101.
- González Mandri, Flora."A House on Shifting Sands." Trans.Jaime Martínez-Tolentino and Flora González Mandri. Michigan Quarterly Review 33.3 (Summer 1994). 553–556.

== Published Books With large portions devoted to Jaime's writings ==
- Román-Capeles, Mervin. "El cuento fantástico en Puerto Rico y Cuba." Kassel, Germany: Clark Atlanta University and Edition Reichenberger, 1995. [See pps. 72–85]
- Ayala-Richards, Haydée. "La presencia Taína en la narrativa puertorriqueña." Lewiston, NY: The Edwin Mellen Press, 2003. [See pps. 84–108]
- Bravo Rozas, Cristina. "La narrativa del miedo: Terror y horror en el cuento de puerto Rico." Madrid, Spain: Editorial Verbum, 2013. [See pps. 151; 173–174; 187–188; 192–193; 224.]

== Awards ==
- Second Prize, Short Story Category, “Jogos Florais”, Lisbon, Portugal, 1970.
- Honors Certificate for Literary Merit and Contributions to Puerto Rican Letters, Sociedad de Autores Puerrtorriqueños, San Juan, Puerto Rico, March 17, 1984.
- Finalist, Short Story Category, "Premio Literario Letras de Oro," American Express and the University of Miami, 1988.
- Certificate, “Primer Concurso Internacional Sobre la Historia de Puerto Rico” [First International Contest On Puerto Rican History], Consejo Superior de Educación de Puerto Rico [Puerto Rican Council of Higher Education], San Juan, Puerto Rico, 1989.
- 1993 Western New York Writer-In-Residence, "Just Buffalo Literary Center," Buffalo, N.Y., 1993.
- Finalist, "Family Matters" Category, 2007 Glimmer Train Magazine Literary Awards, Portland, Oregon.
- Winner, Short Story category, 2014 Wildsound Writing Festival, Toronto, Canada.
- 2016 Nominee Nobel Prize in Literature.
