= Picaleña (Ibagué) =

Neighborhood of Ibagué, Colombia

Picaleña is an area of the city of Ibagué, Colombia, about 10 kilometres from the city centre where the Tolima Museum of the Plastic Arts (Museo de Artes Plasticas del Tolima) is located. It is one of the largest residential areas of the city.

== History ==
Soon after the city's founding on June 25, 1550 by Andrés López de Galarza y Francisco de Trejo at the present site of the town of Cajamarca, the city was moved 100 mi away to its current location due to constant attacks from the indigenous Pijao people, who were the native inhabitants of the region. This was the situation until the Pijao were exterminated during the Spanish conquest to secure the gold routes to the Magdalena River.

In 1650, the rapid expansion of Ibagué, at that time a small community of about 5000 people, forced the Spanish administration to allocate more land to incoming people from Spain. The solution was to clear open grassland to build a residential area that could not only be settled by the poor and homeless, but could also increase the status of the city and persuade wealthier people to move there. The result was a 100 mi area that was distributed among a massive number of people that flooded the city. However, there were many inconveniences as the town could not offer enough resources to supply the high demand; as a result, the project was aborted just three years later.

The name Picaleña was taken from a word in the Pijao language which meaning "progress".

== Demography ==
This residential area is the home of about 100,000 people and currently covers an area equivalent to the city centre of Ibagué.
