= Tenerife, Magdalena =

Coordinates: 10°00′N 74°40′W

Tenerife
- town
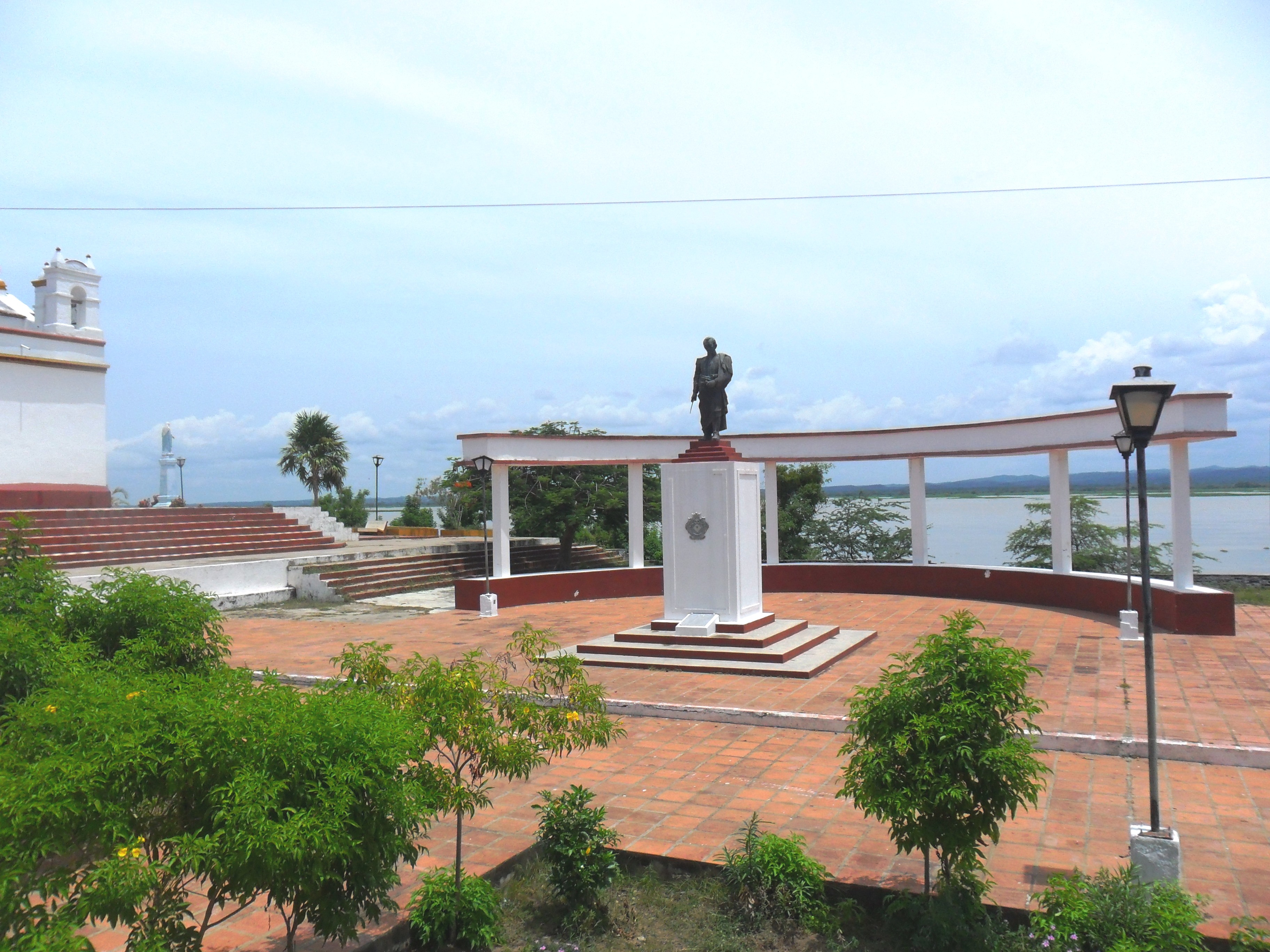

- Flag

- Location of the municipality and town of Tenerife in the Department of Magdalena.
- Country: Colombia
- Region: Caribbean
- Department: Magdalena

Area
  - Total: 694 km^{2} (268 sq mi)

Population (Census 2018)
  - Total: 12,364
  - Density: 17.8/km^{2} (46.1/sq mi)
- Time zone: UTC-5
- Website: www.tenerife-magdalena.gov.co

Tenerife is a town and municipality of the Magdalena Department in northern Colombia.
