= Venadillo =

Municipality in Tolima, Colombia

Coordinates: 4°45′N 74°55′W

- Municipality and town
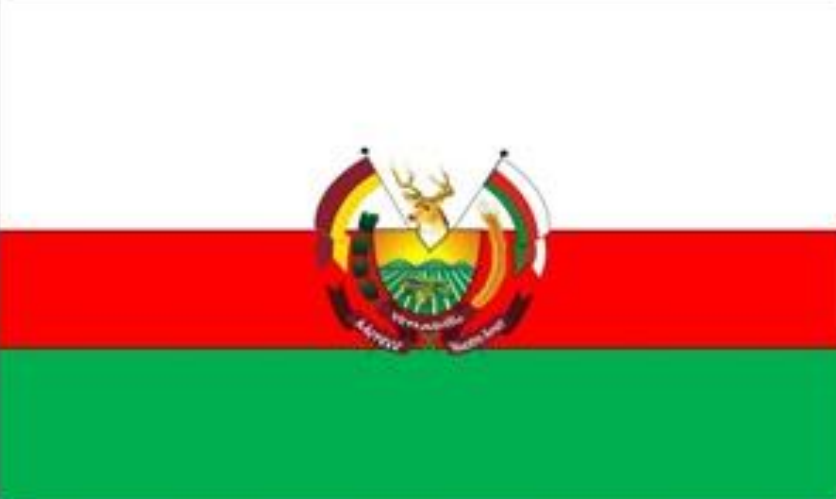
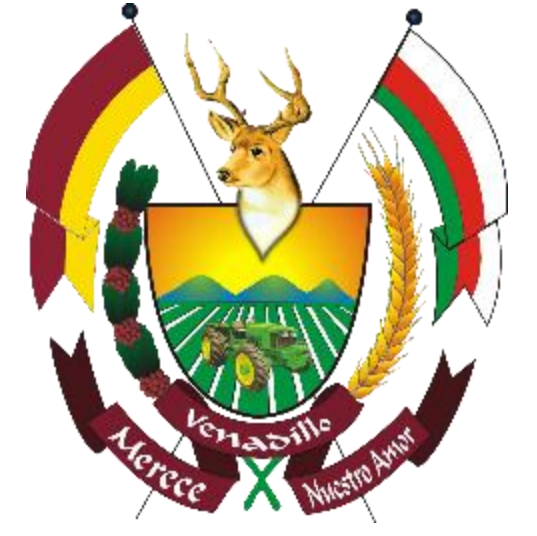
- Flag Coat of arms

- Location of the municipality and town of Venadillo in the Tolima Department of Colombia.
- Country: Colombia
- Department: Tolima Department

Area
  - Total: 358 km^{2} (138 sq mi)
- Elevation: 349 m (1,145 ft)

Population (2015)
  - Total: 19,586
- Time zone: UTC-5 (Colombia Standard Time)

Venadillo is a town and municipality in the Tolima department of Colombia. The population of the municipality was 13,266 as of 2024. Venadillo is 56 kilometres northeast of Ibagué.

== History ==
The area where Venadillo was founded was historically inhabited by Citirques, Guambaimas, Colombaimas and Tolonies tribes of the Panche linguistic family and the Chocarí tribe of the Pijao. The name is derived from the local population of deer.

Venadillo was founded as a hamlet on 2 September 1560 by Bartolomé de Frías y Carvajal, as a deer husbandry site. The town was expanded in its second foundation on 29 November 1596 through Venadillo's first serving mayor, Juan García de Herrera. Its third and final foundation was in 1710 under Manuel Antonio Maldonado Martínez.

On 21 February 1863, Venadillo became a municipality, which went into effect on 1 January 1864.

In the main park, the statue "Los Venados" commemorates Ponjo, a local tribal chief credited with domesticating the deer, and the namesake animal of Venadillo.

== Administrative division ==
Venadillo's urban centre has twelve barrios. Its rural area is divided into three districts (Junín, Malabar, and Palmarosa), totalling 29 villages.

== Economy ==
Venadillo's economy is primarily agricultural with the widespread farming of rice, corn, sorghum, and cotton. Venadillo also boasts a small tourist economy as a culinary centre for its distinct oatmeal and fritanga, lechona, buñuelos, guarapo, and whiskey.
