= Daniel Camargo Barbosa =

Colombian serial killer

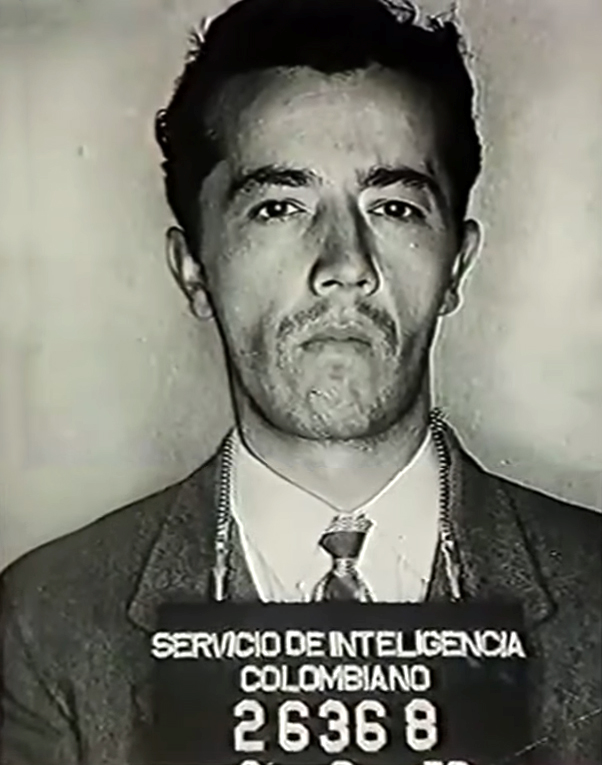
- Camargo in a 1958 police mug shot
- Born: Daniel Camargo Barbosa; 22 January 1930; Anolaima, Cundinamarca, Colombia
- Died: 13 November 1994 (aged 64); Guayaquil, Ecuador
- Cause of death: Stab wounds
- Other names: "The Sadist of El Charquito" "The Monster of the Mangroves"; Manuel Bulgarin Solis
- Convictions: Colombia; Murder; Sexual assault Ecuador; Murder
- Penalty: Colombia; 8-year-sentence (Sexual assault); 25-year sentence (Murder); Ecuador; 16-year sentence

Details
- Victims: 72–180 (2 convicted)
- Span of crimes: 1974–1986
- Country: Colombia, Ecuador
- States: Guayas, Pichincha, Tungurahua, El Oro, Los Ríos
- Date apprehended: 3 May 1974; escaped November 1984; re-apprehended 26 February 1986

Daniel Camargo Barbosa (22 January 1930 – 13 November 1994) was a Colombian serial killer and rapist. He is one of the most prolific serial killers in history and is believed to have raped and murdered at least 72 young girls in Colombia and Ecuador during the 1970s and 1980s.

Barbosa was stabbed to death in prison by the nephew of one of his victims in 1994.

== Early life ==
Camargo's mother died before he had reached the age of one and his father was overbearing and emotionally distant. Afterwards his father married Dioselina Fernandez who had fertility problems. This caused his new stepmother to become abusive to Daniel, humiliating him in various ways. She would beat him and dress him up as a girl and then would force him to go to school dressed that way. His peers and classmates made fun of him. Despite this humiliation, Daniel stood out as a great student at the León XIII school in Bogotá with a reported IQ of 116. However, his desire to continue studying was hampered when he was forced to drop out of school to help his family financially.

== Crimes and imprisonment ==
He was first arrested in Bogotá in 1958 for petty theft.

Camargo had a de facto union with a woman named Alcira and had two children with her. He fell in love with another woman, Esperanza (age 28), whom he planned to marry, but then found out that she was not a virgin. This became the root of Camargo's fixations. He and Esperanza formed an agreement that he would stay with her if she aided him in finding other virgin girls to rape. Thus began a period of their partnership in crime. Esperanza was Camargo's accomplice, luring young girls to an apartment under false pretenses and then drugging them with sodium seconal sleeping pills so that Camargo could rape them. Camargo committed five rapes in this way, but did not kill any of the girls. The fifth child that they abused in this way reported the crime, and both Camargo and Esperanza were arrested and taken to separate prisons. Camargo was convicted of sexual assault in Colombia on 10 April 1964.

A judge sentenced him to three years in prison, and Camargo was initially grateful for the perceived leniency of the judge, swearing to repent and mend his ways. However, a new judge was given precedence over the case and Camargo was sentenced to eight years in prison. This provoked Camargo to rebellious anger. He served his full sentence, and was then released.

In 1973 he was arrested in Brazil for being undocumented. Due to a delay in sending Camargo's criminal records from Colombia, he was deported and released with his false identity. When he returned to Colombia, he took up a job as a street vendor in Barranquilla selling television monitors. One day when passing by a school, he kidnapped a 9-year-old girl, murdering her after committing rape so that she could not inform the police as his previous victim had done. This was his first known assault involving murder.

Camargo was arrested on 3 May 1974 in Barranquilla, Colombia, when he returned to the scene of the crime to recover the television screens that he had left beside the victim. Even though it is believed that he raped and killed more than 80 girls in Colombia, Camargo was imprisoned in Colombia after being convicted of raping and killing a 9-year-old girl. He was initially sentenced to 30 years in prison, but this sentence was reduced to 25 years, and he was interned in the prison on Gorgona Island on 24 December 1977.

== Escape from Colombia to Ecuador ==
In November 1984 Camargo escaped from Gorgona prison (known as the Colombian Alcatraz) in a primitive boat after having carefully studied the ocean currents. The authorities assumed that he died at sea and the press reported that he had been eaten by sharks. He eventually arrived in Quito, Ecuador. He then traveled by bus to Guayaquil on 5 or 6 December 1984. On 18 December he abducted a 9-year-old girl from the city of Quevedo, in the province of Los Ríos, Ecuador. The next day a 10-year-old girl also disappeared.

From 1984 to 1986, Camargo committed a series of at least 54 rapes and murders in Guayaquil. The police at first believed that all the deaths were the work of a gang, not understanding that one man could have killed so many. Camargo slept on the streets, and lived off the money he gained by reselling ballpoint pens. Occasionally he supplemented his income by selling clothing or small valuables belonging to his victims.

== Modus operandi ==
Camargo selected helpless, young, lower-class girls in search of work and approached them, pretending to be a foreigner who needed to find a Protestant pastor in a church on the outskirts of town. He explained that he had to deliver a large sum of money, which he showed them as proof, and he offered them a reward if they would accompany him to show him the way. He pretended that he was a stranger to the area, and hinted at the possibility of the girls getting a job at the factory. No one was suspicious of an older man accompanying a girl or young woman who could be his granddaughter. Camargo would then enter into the woods, claiming to be looking for a shortcut in order to avoid arousing suspicion in his victims. If the girls did grow suspicious and drew back, he did not prevent them from leaving. Camargo raped his victims before strangling them, sometimes stabbing them when they resisted. After his victims were dead, he left their bodies in the forest.

== Arrest ==
Camargo was arrested by two policemen in Quito on 26 February 1986, only a few minutes after he had murdered a 9-year-old girl named Elizabeth. The policemen were on patrol and approached him at the height of the avenue Los Granados, thinking that he was acting suspiciously. They found that he was carrying with him a bag containing the bloody clothes and clitoris of his latest victim, and a copy of Crime and Punishment by Dostoyevsky. He was taken into custody and later moved to Guayaquil for identification. When he was arrested he gave a false name, Manuel Bulgarin Solis, but he was later identified by María Alexandra Vélez who was one of his rape victims that had escaped.

Daniel Camargo calmly confessed to killing 72 girls in Ecuador since escaping from the Colombian island prison. He led authorities to the dumping grounds of those victims whose bodies had not yet been recovered. The bodies had been dismembered. While he told the Ecuadorian authorities of the locations of the bodies and how the sadistic crimes were committed, he showed no feelings of remorse. After raping his victims, he had hacked, slashed and crushed the girls with a machete. He gave a cynical explanation for choosing children. He wanted virgins "because they cried"; this apparently gave him greater satisfaction. According to Camargo, he killed because he wanted revenge on women's unfaithfulness. He hated them for not being what he believed women were supposed to be.

== Interview ==
In June 1986 Francisco Febres Cordero, a journalist for the newspaper Hoy (Today), managed to arrange an interview with Camargo. It was difficult to get the interview due to the police blocking all access to Camargo, and the fact that Camargo himself demanded a large fee before he would let himself be interviewed. The journalist pretended to be part of a group of psychologists that were allowed access to the prisoner, allowing him to ask Camargo searching questions without arousing his suspicion.

== Sentence ==
Camargo was convicted in 1989 and sentenced to 16 years in prison, the maximum sentence available in Ecuador at the time. While serving his sentence in the Garcia Moreno de Quito jail, he claimed to have converted to Christianity.

== Death ==
On 13 November 1994, Camargo was stabbed to death in prison by Geovanny Noguera, who was a nephew of one of his victims. He was 64 years old at the time of his death.

== See also ==
- List of serial killers in Colombia
