= Manuel Octavio Bermúdez =

Colombian serial killer (1961–2024)

Manuel Octavio Bermúdez Estrada
- Born: Manuel Octavio Bermúdez Estrada; 15 October 1961; Trujillo, Valle del Cauca, Colombia
- Died: 17 October 2024 (aged 63); Cauca Department, Colombia
- Cause of death: Homicide (gunshot wounds)
- Other name: The Monster of the Cane Fields
- Convictions: Murder; Rape
- Penalty: 25 years in prison

Details
- Victims: 21–50+
- Span of crimes: 1999–2003
- Country: Colombia
- Date apprehended: 18 July 2003

Manuel Octavio Bermúdez Estrada (15 October 1961 – 17 October 2024) was a Colombian serial killer and rapist who confessed to killing 21 children in remote areas of Colombia. He was given the nickname El Monstruo de los Cañaduzales ("The Monster of the Cane Fields").

== Biography ==
Manuel Octavio Bermúdez was born in Trujillo, Valle del Cauca, Colombia on 15 October 1961, and was orphaned after birth. He was adopted by an abusive mother who threw him off a balcony, breaking his hand and foot. This gave him a permanent limp. He was given to another family in the city of Palmira. His new parents were alcoholics and his father was described as abusive. Bermúdez later had several children of his own.

Bermúdez raped and killed at least 21 children in several towns of Valle del Cauca from 1999 to 2003. He had worked as an ice cream vendor and would lure his victims to corn fields with offers of money for picking corn. Bermúdez would then rape and strangle them while sometimes injecting them with a syringe.

The mother of 12-year-old Luis Carlos Gálvez reported his disappearance and Bermúdez had been seen with him. He was arrested on 18 July 2003. Investigators inspected a room he had rented in El Cairo and found newspaper clippings of the murders, syringes, Lidocaine, and the wristwatch Luis Carlos Gálvez was wearing the day he disappeared.

Bermúdez confessed to the murders of 21 children, 17 of whom were found and was sentenced to 25 years in prison on 20 March 2004. He is suspected of killing over 50 children.

On 17 October 2024, only two days after his 63rd birthday, Bermúdez was killed during an ambush against a prison vehicle in which he was travelling on the Pan-American Highway in the department of Cauca. The attack was blamed on FARC dissidents. Two prison guards and another inmate were also killed in the shooting.

== See also ==
- List of serial killers in Colombia
- List of serial killers by number of victims
