= National Penitentiary and Prison Institute (Colombia) =

Colombian central government agency

- Instituto Nacional Penitenciario y Carcelario

Agency overview
- Formed: 30 December 1992
- Preceding agencies: General Directorate of Prisons; Revolving Fund of the Ministry of Justice
- Headquarters: Calle 26 № 27-48 Bogotá, D.C., Colombia
- Annual budget: COP$1,202,174,529,951 (2012); COP$891,264,671,119 (2013); COP$938,995,115,725 (2014)
- Agency executive: Director
- Parent agency: Ministry of Justice and Law
- Website: inpec.gov.co

The National Penitentiary and Prison Institute, INPEC, is the Colombian central government agency responsible for the incarceration and rehabilitation of convicted criminal offenders, and administration of the penitentiary institutions in the country
