= List of shipwrecks in 1802 =

The list of shipwrecks in 1802 includes ships sunk, foundered, wrecked, grounded, or otherwise lost during 1802.

table of contents
1802
Jan	Feb	Mar	Apr
May	Jun	Jul	Aug
Sep	Oct	Nov	Dec
Unknown date

== January ==
=== 1 January ===
List of shipwrecks: 1 January 1802
Ship	State	Description
Commerce	United States	The brig was wrecked off Bermuda. Her crew were rescued.
Roebuck	United States	The schooner was wrecked off Bermuda. Her crew were rescued. She was on a voyage from Boston, Massachusetts, to the West Indies.

=== 4 January ===
List of shipwrecks: 4 January 1802
Ship	State	Description
Anowan	United States	The ship was lost near Dunkirk, Nord, France, with the loss of all but two of her crew. She was on a voyage from New York to Amsterdam, North Holland, Batavian Republic.
HMS Coromandel	Royal Navy	The troopship was driven ashore near Jamaica. She was refloated on 18 January and sailed for Martinique.
Omnibus	Batavian Republic	The ship was wrecked near Calais, France, while on a voyage from Rotterdam, South Holland to Livorno, Grand Duchy of Tuscany.

=== 5 January ===
List of shipwrecks: 5 January 1802
Ship	State	Description
Nine unnamed vessels	Flags unknown	The ships were driven onto the Seaton Sands, in the North Sea off the coast of County Durham, United Kingdom. Three of them were wrecked.

=== 7 January ===
List of shipwrecks: 7 January 1802
Ship	State	Description
Pilgrim	United Kingdom	The ship departed from Dover Kent for Liverpool, Lancashire. No further trace, presumed foundered with the loss of all hands.

=== 8 January ===
List of shipwrecks: 8 January 1802
Ship	State	Description
Adler	Flag unknown	The brig was driven ashore at Saltfleet, Lincolnshire, United Kingdom. She was refloated on 19 January.
Nelson	United Kingdom	The ship foundered while on a voyage from St. Ives, Cornwall, to São Miguel Island, Azores. Her crew were rescued by Dorothea Maria (Portugal).

=== 9 January ===
List of shipwrecks: 9 January 1802
Ship	State	Description
Betty	United Kingdom	The ship was wrecked at Strangford, County Down. Her crew survived.
Welwaart	Batavian Republic	The ship was holed by an anchor and sank at Le Havre, Seine-Inférieure, France. She was on a voyage from Rotterdam, South Holland to Le Havre.

=== 10 January ===
List of shipwrecks: 10 January 1802
Ship	State	Description
Jane	United Kingdom	The brig was wrecked on Inchcape while on a voyage from Rotterdam, South Holland, Batavian Republic, to Aberdeen. Her crew survived.

=== 11 January ===
List of shipwrecks: 11 January 1802
Ship	State	Description
Minerva	United States	The ship was wrecked at Cape Cod, Massachusetts, while on a voyage from Madeira, Portugal, to Salem, Massachusetts. Her crew were rescued.

=== 13 January ===
List of shipwrecks: 13 January 1802
Ship	State	Description
Beneidung	Batavian Republic	The ship was lost on "Wattow Island". She was on a voyage from Pillau, Prussia, to Amsterdam, North Holland.

=== 16 January ===
List of shipwrecks: 16 January 1802
Ship	State	Description
Planter's Reward	United Kingdom	The ship foundered in the North Sea off Eyemouth, Berwickshire, while on a voyage from Alloa, Clackmannanshire, to Berwick-upon-Tweed, Northumberland.

=== 17 January ===
List of shipwrecks: 17 January 1802
Ship	State	Description
Vigilantia	Batavian Republic	The ship was wrecked on the Portuguese coast. She was on a voyage from Dordrecht, South Holland to Smyrna, Ottoman Empire.

=== 20 January ===
List of shipwrecks: 20 January 1802
Ship	State	Description
Admiral Packenham	United Kingdom	The ship was driven ashore at Cork. She was on a voyage from Saint Croix, Virgin Islands to Cork.
Four Brothers	United Kingdom	The ship was driven ashore and wrecked on Spurn Point, Yorkshire, while on a voyage from South Shields, County Durham, to London.
Four unnamed vessels	Flags unknown	The ships were driven ashore in Dublin Bay. They were refloated the next day.

=== 21 January ===
List of shipwrecks: 21 January 1802
Ship	State	Description
Ann	United Kingdom	The brig was driven ashore at Ayr. All on board were rescued.
Caledonia	United Kingdom	The brig was driven ashore at Ayr. All on board were rescued.
Eclipse	United Kingdom	The ship foundered in the Atlantic Ocean off Brest, Finistère, France. She was on a voyage from Newcastle upon Tyne, Northumberland, to Porto, Portugal.
Favourite	United Kingdom	The ship was driven ashore and wrecked at Elen, County Donegal, with the loss of a crew member. She was on a voyage from Tobago to the Clyde.
Friendship	United Kingdom	The ship was driven ashore between Calderfoot, Cumberland and the mouth of the River Duddon.
Heart of Oak	United Kingdom	The ship foundered in the North Sea off Scarborough, Yorkshire, while on a voyage from London to Sunderland, County Durham.
Johanna	United Kingdom	The ship sank near in the Humber near Brough, Yorkshire with the loss of four lives. She was on a voyage from Selby to Hull.
Layland	United Kingdom	The ship was driven ashore between Calderfoot and the mouth of the River Duddon.
Mary	United States	The ship was driven ashore and wrecked at Loch Indaal, Islay, United Kingdom, while on a voyage from New York to Greenock, Renfrewshire, United Kingdom.
Mary	United Kingdom	The ship was driven ashore between Calderfoot and the mouth of the River Duddon.
Minerva	United Kingdom	The ship was driven ashore and wrecked near Pwllheli, Caernarfonshire. There were six survivors. She was on a voyage from Grenada to Greenock.
Minerva	United Kingdom	The ship was wrecked at Turks Island.
Newcastle	United Kingdom	The brig was driven ashore at Hollesley Bay, Suffolk. Her crew were rescued. She floated off but subsequently foundered.
New Fair Trader	United Kingdom	The ship was driven on shore and wrecked at Dublin. Her crew were rescued. She was on a voyage from Antigua to Dublin.
Nostra Señora del Carmen del Begona	Spain	The ship was wrecked on the Welsh coast while on a voyage from Bilbao to Bristol, Gloucestershire, United Kingdom.
Nymph	United Kingdom	The ship was wrecked in St. Bride's Bay while on a voyage from Saint Croix, Virgin Islands to Cork.
Peggy	United Kingdom	The sloop foundered in Liverpool Bay with the loss of eleven of her twelve crew. She was on a voyage from Cork to Liverpool.
Phœnix	United Kingdom	The sloop foundered in the North Sea off Scarborough.
Princess Royal	United Kingdom	The ship was driven ashore and wrecked at Cayeux-sur-Mer, Somme, France. Her crew were rescued.
Prosperity	United Kingdom	The ship was driven ashore between Calderfoot and the mouth of the River Duddon.
Richard	United Kingdom	The ship foundered in the Irish Sea off Caernarfon with the loss of all hands.
Rio Douro	Portugal	The ship was wrecked on the Cockle Sand in the North Sea off Great Yarmouth, Norfolk. Her crew were rescued. She was on a voyage from Porto to Newcastle upon Tyne, Northumberland, United Kingdom.
Roebuck	United Kingdom	The ship was driven ashore between Calderfoot and the mouth of the River Duddon with the loss of a crew member.
Sarah	United Kingdom	The ship was driven ashore between Calderfoot and the mouth of the River Duddon.
Thomas and Alice	United Kingdom	The brig was driven on the Herd Sand, in the North Sea off North Shields, Northumberland. Her crew were rescued by the lifeboat Northumberland (United Kingdom).
Triton	United Kingdom	The ship was driven ashore between Calderfoot and the mouth of the River Duddon.
True Friend	United Kingdom	The ship was driven ashore at Southwold, Suffolk. Her crew were rescued. She was subsequently destroyed by fire.
Unnamed	United Kingdom	The sloop foundered off Scarborough.
Unnamed	United Kingdom	The sloop was driven ashore between Hull and Paull, Yorkshire. She was refloated.
Unnamed	United Kingdom	The sloop sank in the Humber at Hessle, Yorkshire with the loss of two of her three crew.
Unnamed	United Kingdom	The ship was driven ashore between Calderfoot and the mouth of the River Duddon.
Unnamed	United Kingdom	The ship was driven ashore near Kirkcudbright.

=== 22 January ===
List of shipwrecks: 22 January 1802
Ship	State	Description
Die Siebe	Batavian Republic	The ship foundered in the Irish Sea off Holyhead, Anglesey, United Kingdom, while on a voyage from Rotterdam, South Holland to Dublin.
Lively	United Kingdom	The sloop was driven in to HMS Amazon (Royal Navy) in the North Sea off Deal, Kent, and foundered. Her crew were rescued.

=== 24 January ===
List of shipwrecks: 24 January 1802
Ship	State	Description
Aurora	United Kingdom	The ship was driven ashore at São Miguel Island, Azores.`
Charleton	United Kingdom	The ship was driven ashore in Annatto Bay, Jamaica.
Cito	United Kingdom	The ship foundered in the Mediterranean Sea off Málaga, Spain.
Friendship	United Kingdom	The drogher was driven ashore in Bucknor's Bay, Jamaica.
Jupiter	United Kingdom	The ship was driven ashore at Rio Bueno, Jamaica, and was destroyed by fire.
Lancaster	United Kingdom	The ship was driven ashore in Annatto Bay.
Lucy	United Kingdom	The brig was driven ashore in Montego Bay, Jamaica.
Mary	United Kingdom	The ship was driven ashore in Montego Bay.
New Hope	Batavian Republic	The ship foundered in the Mediterranean Sea off Málaga.
New Invention	United Kingdom	The ship foundered in the Mediterranean Sea off Málaga.
Perseverance	United Kingdom	The brig was driven ashore in Montego Bay.
Star	Spain	The barque foundered in the Mediterranean Sea off Málaga.
Thomas	United Kingdom	The ship was driven ashore in Montego Bay.
William	United States	The ship was driven ashore and wrecked at Orraccabessa.

=== 26 January ===
List of shipwrecks: 26 January 1802
Ship	State	Description
Hannah & Mary	United States	The ship foundered in the Atlantic Ocean while on a voyage from Gibraltar to Boston, Massachusetts. Her crew were rescued.
Perseverance	United Kingdom	The ship foundered in the North Sea while on a voyage from Southwold, Suffolk, to Hull, Yorkshire. Her crew were rescued.

=== 27 January ===
List of shipwrecks: 27 January 1802
Ship	State	Description
Pursuit	United Kingdom	The ship was driven ashore on the coast of Surinam.

=== 28 January ===
List of shipwrecks: 28 January 1802
Ship	State	Description
Betty	United Kingdom	The sloop was wrecked on the Point of Towart while on a voyage from Rothsay, Isle of Bute to Glasgow, Renfrewshire.
HM Hired cutter Black Joke	Royal Navy	The cutter was destroyed by fire at Plymouth, Devon.

=== Unknown date ===
List of shipwrecks: Unknown date in January 1802
Ship	State	Description
Admiral Mann	United Kingdom	The transport ship was wrecked at Alexandria, Egypt, at the end of January.
Adriana	United States	The ship was crushed by ice and sunk in the Delaware River.
Adventure	United Kingdom	The ship foundered with the loss of all hands. She was on a voyage from Dublin to Wicklow.
Anna	Batavian Republic	The ship was wrecked on the Dutch coast while on a voyage from Greetzijl, Kingdom of Handover to Rotterdam, South Holland.
Anna Maria	United Kingdom	The ship was driven ashore in the Bristol Channel.
Antoinetta	Flag unknown	The ship was driven ashore. She was refloated ahd put in to Helsingør, Denmark on 9 January.
Arethusa	United Kingdom	The ship was lost on the Île-à-Vache. Her crew were rescued. She was on a voyage from London to Jamaica.
Asia	United Kingdom	The ship was driven ashore and wrecked south of Peel, Isle of Man while on a voyage from the Leeward Islands to the Clyde. All on board were rescued.
Aurora	United States	The ship was wrecked on the Gunfleet Sands, in the North Sea off the coast of Essex, United Kingdom. Her crew were rescued by London Packet (United Kingdom). Aurora was on a voyage from Hamburg to Charleston, South Carolina.
Chesterfield	United Kingdom	The ship was driven ashore in the River Thames. She was on a voyage from Surinam to London.
Commerce	United Kingdom	The ship was driven ashore and wrecked at Figueira da Foz, Portugal. She was on a voyage from London to Antigua.
Dessaix	French Navy	The Téméraire-class ship of the line was wrecked at Cap Français, Saint-Domingue.
Elizabeth	United Kingdom	The ship was abandoned at sea. She was subsequently taken in to Dublin.
Endeavour	United Kingdom	The ship was wrecked on the coast of Swedish Pomerania. Her crew were rescued.
Exchange	United Kingdom	The ship was wrecked on the Dutch coast.
Expeditie	Batavian Republic	The ship was lost on the coast of Holland. Her crew were rescued. She was on a voyage from Amsterdam to London.
HMS Fly	Royal Navy	The Swan-class ship sloop foundered in the Atlantic Ocean off Cape Flattery, Newfoundland, British North America.
Fortitude	United Kingdom	The ship was driven ashore near Sligo.
Frances-Ann	United Kingdom	The ship foundered off Liverpool, Lancashire, while on a voyage from Belfast, County Down, to Liverpool.
Franklin	United States	The ship was wrecked on the Dutch coast with the loss of all but one of her crew. She was on a voyage from Philadelphia, Pennsylvania, to Amsterdam.
Frederick	United Kingdom	The ship was driven ashore near Dragør, Denmark. She was on a voyage from Danzig to Plymouth, Devon.
Gannymede	United Kingdom	The ship was wrecked on Oesel while on a voyage from Gothenburg, Sweden, to Saint Petersburg, Russia. Her crew were rescued.
George	United Kingdom	The ship was wrecked at Westport, County Mayo, while on a voyage from Surinam to Dublin.
Goodintent	United Kingdom	The ship was wrecked on the coast of Holland with the loss of all hands. She was on a voyage from Saint Petersburg to Lisbon, Portugal.
Grafton	United Kingdom	The ship was driven ashore and wrecked on the Holderness coast, Yorkshire. She was on a voyage from North Shields, Northumberland, to London.
Happy Enterprise	United Kingdom	The ship was lost in The Swin, off the coast of Essex. She was on a voyage from Saint Petersburg to London.
Harmony	United States	The ship was driven ashore and wrecked at Tramore, County Waterford, United Kingdom.
Henry	United Kingdom	The ship was driven ashore and wrecked at Southwold, Suffolk. She was on a voyage from Cley-next-the-Sea, Norfolk to London.
Indefatigable	United Kingdom	The ship was driven ashore at Parkgate, Cheshire.
Industry	United Kingdom	The ship was abandoned in the North Sea. She was on a voyage from South Shields to Liverpool. She was subsequently taken in to Great Yarmouth.
Isabella & Mary	United Kingdom	The ship was wrecked on Texel, North Holland, Batavian Republic, while on a voyage from a Baltic port to Sunderland, County Durham.
James and Mary	United Kingdom	The ship foundered while on a voyage from Poole, Dorset, to Hull, Yorkshire.
John and Edward	United Kingdom	The ship was driven ashore and wrecked at Six Mill Point, Dublin.
Kennion	United Kingdom	The Guineaman was wrecked off Martinique at the end of January with the loss of over 300 lives, most of them slaves. There were only eight survivors.
Kitty	United Kingdom	The ship ran aground off Falsterbo, Sweden. She was later refloated and taken in to Copenhagen, Denmark, for repairs.
Leda	United Kingdom	The ship foundered in the Kattegat while on a voyage from Riga to Hull.
Leonard	United Kingdom	The ship departed from Virginia, United States, for Liverpool. No further trace, presumed foundered in the Atlantic Ocean with the loss of all hands.
HDMS Le Triton	(Denmark) Dano-Norwegian Navy	The frigate foundered in the Mediterranean Sea off Hyères, Var, France, with the loss of all hands.
Louise	(Denmark) Norway	The ship was lost near Brielle, South Holland, Batavian Republic.
Margaret	United Kingdom	The ship was lost near Brielle. She was on a voyage from Riga, Russia, to Rotterdam, South Holland.
Mary	United Kingdom	The ship was driven ashore on Saltholm, Denmark.
Maryann	United Kingdom	The ship was driven ashore near Sligo.
Mersy	United Kingdom	The ship ran aground on the Ammeland Reef. She was on a voyage from Christiania, Norway to Shoreham-by-Sea, Sussex. She was refloated and taken into "Durkster Island".
Minerva	United Kingdom	The ship foundered off Turk Island while on a voyage from New Brunswick, British North America, to Jamaica.
Nancy	United Kingdom	The full-rigged ship was wrecked at Cape Trafalgar, Spain with the loss of two lives. She was on a voyage from London to Naples, Kingdom of Sicily.
xxxx	United Kingdom	The .
Nassau	United Kingdom	The ship foundered in the English Channel off Boulogne, Pas-de-Calais, France, with the loss of nine of her crew. She was on a voyage from Jamaica to London.
New Century	United Kingdom	The ship was driven ashore at Hoylake, Cheshire.
New Thompson	United Kingdom	The ship was wrecked at Youghal, County Cork, while on a voyage from Milford Haven, Pembrokeshire, to Dungarvan, County Waterford.
Peggy	United Kingdom	The ship was driven ashore and wrecked south of Peel, Isle of Man with the loss of two of her crew. She was on a voyage from Drogheda, County Louth, to Newry, County Down.
Phœnix	United Kingdom	The sloop foundered in the North Sea off Scarborough, Yorkshire. Her crew were rescued.
Royal George	United Kingdom	The ship was wrecked at São Miguel Island, Azores. Her crew were rescued.
Sachem	United States	The ship was wrecked near Holyhead, Anglesey, United Kingdom, while on a voyage from Virginia to Dublin.
Sally	United Kingdom	The ship was wrecked in the Humber.
Shannon	United Kingdom	The ship was driven ashore and wrecked on Saltholm. She was later refloated and taken in to Helsingør.
Sovereign	United Kingdom	The ship was driven ashore at Milford Haven, Pembrokeshire. She was on a voyage from Dublin to Saint Vincent. She was refloated.
Swallow	United Kingdom	The ship was run down and sunk by Lord Duncan (United Kingdom) while on a voyage from Newfoundland, British North America to Dartmouth, Devon. Her crew were rescued by Lord Duncan.
Thomas & Fanny	United Kingdom	The ship was wrecked on the Home Sands, in the North Sea off Lowestoft, Suffolk. Two of her crew were lost.
Thomas and Sally	United Kingdom	The ship was wrecked at Killybegs, County Donegal, while on a voyage from Liverpool to Sligo.
Three Friends	United Kingdom	The ship was driven ashore and wrecked at Six Mill Point, Dublin while on a voyage from Dungarvan, County Waterford, to Dublin.
Union	United Kingdom	The ship was driven ashore and wrecked on Saltholm.
United States	United Kingdom	The ship was wrecked on the Flemish Banks, in the North Sea off Ostend, Lys, France, while on a voyage from Banff, Aberdeenshire, to Ostend.
Urania	United Kingdom	The ship was driven ashore at Aldeburgh, Suffolk, while on a voyage from Rotterdam, to London.
Volunteer	United Kingdom	The ship was driven ashore on Tunbury Beach while on a voyage from Londonderry to Liverpool.
Williamson	United Kingdom	The ship was driven ashore at Margate, Kent. She was on a voyage from London to Jamaica. She was refloated.
Young Matilda	Hamburg	The ship was wrecked on the Dutch coast while on a voyage from Hambro' to Bilbao, Spain.
Unnamed	United States	The brig was driven ashore and went to pieces at Naples, Kingdom of the Two Sicilies sometime in December, 1801 or before 11 January, 1802, but possibly on 21 December.
Unnamed	(Ottoman Empire) Ottoman Greece	The polacre was driven ashore at Naples, Kingdom of the Two Sicilies sometime if December, 1801 or before 11 January, 1802, but possibly on 21 December.
Three unnamed vessels	Flags unknown	The ships were driven ashore in the Bristol Channel.
Six unnamed vessels	Flags unknown	The ships were driven ashore at Parkgate.
Unnamed	Prussia	The galiot was wrecked near Holyhead.
Unnamed	Denmark	The ship ran aground off Portsmouth, Hampshire, United Kingdom.

== February ==
=== 4 February ===
List of shipwrecks: 4 February 1802
Ship	State	Description
Providence	United Kingdom	The ship was run down in the North Sea 4 nautical miles (7.4 km) south east of Cromer, Norfolk, by Elizabeth (United Kingdom) while on a voyage from Chatham, Kent, to Blakeney, Norfolk. Her crew were rescued by Elizabeth. She was subsequently beached at Great Yarmouth, Norfolk.

=== 5 February ===
List of shipwrecks: 5 February 1802
Ship	State	Description
General Oglethorpe	United States	The ship was wrecked on a reef north east of Whale Key, 6 nautical miles (11 km) off the coast of the United States. Twenty-three of the 38 people on board were lost. She was on a voyage from Charleston, South Carolina, to Havana, Cuba.
Several unnamed vessels	Flags unknown	Five or six ships, including a Guineaman, were wrecked near Whale Key.

=== 6 February ===
List of shipwrecks: 6 February 1802
Ship	State	Description
Robin	France	The ship foundered 3 leagues (9 nautical miles (17 km)) off Roydon, on the Terrier Vert coast.
Syren	United Kingdom	The ship was wrecked on Scroby Sands, Norfolk. Her crew were rescued.

=== 7 February ===
List of shipwrecks: 7 February 1802
Ship	State	Description
Industry	United Kingdom	The ship was driven ashore at Calais, France, while on a voyage from Hull, Yorkshire, to Southampton, Hampshire.
Junior	United Kingdom	The ship was driven ashore at Calais while on a voyage from Deal, Kent, to Calais.
Robert & Sally	United Kingdom	The ship was driven ashore at Calais while on a voyage from Sunderland, County Durham, to Plymouth, Devon.
Unity's Increase	United Kingdom	The ship was driven ashore at Calais while on a voyage from Sunderland to Plymouth.
Unnamed	United Kingdom	The collier, a brig, was wrecked on the Cockle Sand, in the North Sea off the coast of Norfolk.

=== 8 February ===
List of shipwrecks: 8 February 1802
Ship	State	Description
Hope	United Kingdom	The ship was wrecked at Barnstaple, Devon, with the loss of all hands. She was on a voyage from Lisbon, Portugal, to Bristol, Gloucestershire.

=== 9 February ===
List of shipwrecks: 9 February 1802
Ship	State	Description
Maria	United Kingdom	The ship was wrecked near St. Agnes, Cornwall, with the loss of five of her crew. She was on a voyage from Dublin to Guernsey, Channel Islands, and the West Indies.

=== 11 February ===
List of shipwrecks: 11 February 1802
Ship	State	Description
Totin	United Kingdom	The ship was wrecked at "Ivica" while on a voyage from Gibraltar to Mahón, Spain.

=== 12 February ===
List of shipwrecks: 12 February 1802
Ship	State	Description
Fortune	United Kingdom	The ship was wrecked on the Seven Stones Reef while on a voyage from London to Dublin with the loss of two lives.

=== 15 February ===
List of shipwrecks: 15 February 1802
Ship	State	Description
Desaix	French Navy	The ship was wrecked on the Cape of Good Hope.
Santo-Gerano	French Navy	The ship ran aground at the Cape of Good Hope.
Tartar	United Kingdom	The ship departed from Cádiz, Spain, for London. No further trace, presumed foundered with the loss of all hands.

=== 18 February ===
List of shipwrecks: 18 February 1802
Ship	State	Description
Two Friends	United Kingdom	The ship was wrecked on the Goodwin Sands, Kent. Her crew survived. She was on a voyage from Weymouth, Dorset, to London.

=== 20 February ===
List of shipwrecks: 20 February 1802
Ship	State	Description
Lion	(United Kingdom of Great Britain and Ireland) Guernsey	The ship was driven ashore near Calais, France. She was on a voyage from Emden, Prussia, to Guernsey. Lion was later refloated.

=== 22 February ===
List of shipwrecks: 22 February 1802
Ship	State	Description
Brutus	United States	The ship was driven ashore and wrecked at Cape Cod.
Europa	United Kingdom	The ship foundered in the Bristol Channel with the loss of seven of her crew. She was on a voyage from Bristol, Gloucestershire, to Martinique, West Indies.
Two Brothers	Batavian Republic	The ship was driven ashore and wrecked at Fécamp, Seine-Inférieure, France, while on a voyage from Amsterdam, North Holland to La Rochelle, Loire-Inférieure, France.
Ulysses	United States	The ship was driven ashore and wrecked at Cape Cod.
Volusia	United States	The ship was driven ashore at Cape Cod, one mile from the wreck of the Ulysses.

=== 24 February ===
List of shipwrecks: 24 February 1802
Ship	State	Description
Brothers	United Kingdom	The ship was wrecked at Holyhead, Anglesey with the loss of a crew member. She was on a voyage from Lisbon, Portugal, to Liverpool, Lancashire.
Charleston	United States	The full-rigged ship was driven ashore in Annatto Bay, Jamaica.
Flirt	United Kingdom	The ship was driven ashore at Torbay, Devon, and wrecked. She was on a voyage from São Miguel Island, Azores to Bristol, Gloucestershire. Her crew were rescued.
Fortune	United Kingdom	The ship was driven ashore at Oracabessa, Jamaica. She was later refloated.
Generous Planter	United Kingdom	The ship was driven ashore at Oracabessa.
Grace	United Kingdom	The ship was driven ashore at Rio Bueno, Jamaica. She was later refloated.
Jupiter	United Kingdom	The ship was driven ashore at Rio Bueno. She was carrying a cargo of quicklime, which got wet and set the ship afire, a total loss.
Lancaster	United Kingdom	The full-rigged ship was driven ashore in Annatto Bay.
Lucy	United Kingdom	The brig was driven ashore in Montego Bay, Jamaica.
Mary	United Kingdom	The full-rigged ship was driven ashore and wrecked in Montego Bay.
Perseverance	(United Kingdom of Great Britain and Ireland) Jamaica	The brig was driven ashore and wrecked in Montego Bay.
Thomas	(United Kingdom of Great Britain and Ireland) British North America	The full-rigged ship was driven ashore and wrecked in Montego Bay.
Trelawney Planter	United Kingdom	The ship was driven ashore at Rio Bueno.
William	United States	The brig was lost at Orracabessa.

=== 25 February ===
List of shipwrecks: 25 February 1802
Ship	State	Description
Constantine	United Kingdom	The ship was driven ashore at Whitby, Yorkshire. She was later refloated and taken in to Whitby.
Industry	United Kingdom	The ship was driven ashore and wrecked at Whitby.
Sophia	United Kingdom	The ship was driven ashore at Whitby. She was later refloated and taken in to Whitby.
Suffolk	United Kingdom	The East Indiaman was driven ashore and severely damaged at St. Ives, Cornwall, with the loss of two of her crew. She was on a voyage from Bengal, India, to London. Suffolk was later refloated and taken in to St. Ives. She was subsequently repaired at Falmouth, Cornwall.
Unnamed	Flag unknown	The sloop foundered off Grainthorpe, Lincolnshire, United Kingdom with the loss of all hands.

=== Unknown date ===
List of shipwrecks: Unknown date in February 1802
Ship	State	Description
Abbey	United Kingdom	The ship was driven ashore at Bangor, Caernarfonshire, while on a voyage from Lisbon. Portugal to Liverpool, Lancashire. She was later refloated and taken to Beaumaris, Anglesey where she was destroyed by fire on 9 March.
Active	United Kingdom	The ship was struck by lightning off Málaga, Spain, and destroyed by fire. Her crew were rescued by a French brig.
Alexander and Constantine	United Kingdom	The ship foundered in the Irish Sea off Blacksand, County Mayo. She was on a voyage from Dingle, County Kerry to Liverpool, Lancashire.
Ann	United Kingdom	The ship was driven ashore between Copenhagen and Dragør, Denmark.
Beatrix	United Kingdom	The ship ran aground at Copenhagen, Denmark. She was later refloated and taken in to Helsingør.
Belle Anne	United Kingdom	The ship was driven ashore near Swansea, Glamorgan. She was on a voyage from Swansea to Guernsey, Channel Islands.
Betsey	United Kingdom	The ship was wrecked on the Middle Sand, in the North Sea off the coast of Norfolk. She was on a voyage from South Shields, County Durham, to London. Her crew were rescued.
Catharine Ray	United States	The ship was driven ashore on Long Island, New York. She was on a voytage from Lisbon, Portugal to New York City. She was later refloated, and arrived at New York City on 20 February.
Concordia	United Kingdom	The ship was wrecked at São Miguel Island, Azores.
Delia	United States	The ship foundered in the Tyrrhenian Sea off Naples, Kingdom of Sicily.
Earl Spencer	United Kingdom	The ship was wrecked at Gibraltar.
Fair American	United States	The ship departed from Gibraltar for New York. No further trace, presumed foundered in the Atlantic Ocean with the loss of all hands.
Friendship	United Kingdom	The ship was lost in Carnarvon Bay. She was on a voyage from Waterford to Dublin.
Good Intent	United Kingdom	The ship was wrecked on the Dutch coast while on a voyage from a Norwegian port to Carmarthen.
Hardwicke	United Kingdom	The ship was wrecked on the Cockle Sand, North Sea with the loss of all hands.
Hero	United Kingdom	The ship was driven ashore and wrecked at Guernsey while on a voyage from Naples, Kingdom of Sicily, to Guernsey.
Ilfracombe	United Kingdom	The ship foundered in the Irish Sea off Milford Haven, Pembrokeshire, while on a voyage from Padstow, Cornwall, to Venice. Her crew were rescued.
Jean	United Kingdom	The ship was driven ashore by ice in Malmo Bay. She was refloated.
Jannett	United Kingdom	The ship was driven ashore and wrecked at Rossall, Lancashire. She was on a voyage from Newry, County Down, to Liverpool.
John and Thomas	United Kingdom	The ship was driven ashore at Great Yarmouth, Norfolk.
Kennoul	United Kingdom	The ship was driven ashore and wrecked at Waxham, Norfolk.
Lord Nelson	United Kingdom	The coaster foundered in Tor Bay.
Malta	United Kingdom	The ship foundered in the Atlantic Ocean off St Agnes, Cornwall, while on a voyage from Dublin to Guernsey, Channel Islands.
Mary	United Kingdom	The ship foundered. Her crew were rescued.
Maryanne	United Kingdom	The ship was driven ashore on the coast of Lincolnshire. She was later refloated.
May	United Kingdom	The ship was driven ashore on the west coast of Puerto Rico. She was on a voyage from Trinidad to London. later refloated and beached.
Mermaid	United Kingdom	The ship was driven ashore and wrecked near Kirkcudbright. Her crew were rescued.
Minerva	United Kingdom	The ship was lost near Málaga, Spain. She was on a voyage from South Shields to Barcelona, Spain.
Nautilus	United Kingdom	The ship foundered in the North Sea 40 nautical miles (74 km) off Ostend, Lys, France, with the loss of all but one of her crew. She was on a voyage from Stockholm, Sweden, to London.
Neptune	United Kingdom	The ship was driven ashore in Saint Tudwal's Islands, Caernarfonshire. She was on a voyage from Dublin to Waterford.
Nuestra Señora del Carmen	Spain	The ship was wrecked on the Scarweather Sands, in the Bristol Channel. She was on a voyage from Bilbao to Bristol, Gloucestershire, United Kingdom.
Olive Branch	United Kingdom	The ship was abandoned in the North Sea. She was subsequently taken in to South Shields.
Peggy	United Kingdom	The ship was wrecked at Bideford, Devon, while on a voyage from Lisbon to Greenock, Renfrewshire.
Providence	United Kingdom	The ship was driven ashore and wrecked at Lymington, Hampshire, while on a voyage from Exeter, Devon, to London.
Royal Sovereign	United Kingdom	The ship ran aground off Great Yarmouth. She was on a voyage from Sunderland, County Durham, to Guernsey, Channel Islands.
Thomas	United Kingdom	The ship was driven ashore on the coast of Surinam. She was refloated on 19 February.
William	United Kingdom	The sloop was driven ashore on the Lincolnshire coast with the loss of all but her captain. She was on a voyage from King's Lynn, Norfolk, to Rotherham, Yorkshire. William was later refloated.
Worsley	United Kingdom	The ship was driven ashore at Rock Ferry, Cheshire. She was on a voyage from Dublin to Liverpool.

== March ==
=== 2 March ===
List of shipwrecks: 2 March 1802
Ship	State	Description
Noel en Gutten	Denmark	The ship foundered in the English Channel off Boulogne, Pas-de-Calais, France.
HMS Sensible	Royal Navy	The Magicienne-class frigate ran aground off Mullaitivu, Ceylon and was wrecked.

=== 3 March ===
List of shipwrecks: 3 March 1802
Ship	State	Description
May	United Kingdom	The ship was driven ashore and wrecked at Yarmouth, Isle of Wight.

=== 4 March ===
List of shipwrecks: 4 March 1802
Ship	State	Description
Goodintent	United Kingdom	The brig was driven ashore. She was later refloated and put into Limerick.

=== 9 March ===
List of shipwrecks: 9 March 1802
Ship	State	Description
HMS Childers	Royal Navy	The Childers-class brig-sloop was driven ashore near The Needles, Isle of Wight.
Vine	United Kingdom	The ship ran aground on the Onion Sand, off Orford Ness, Suffolk and was wrecked.

=== 10 March ===
List of shipwrecks: 10 March 1802
Ship	State	Description
Surprize	United Kingdom	The ship foundered in the Atlantic Ocean (38°27′N 58°00′W while on a voyage from New Orleans, New Spain, to Falmouth, Cornwall. Her crew were rescued by Hannah (United States).

=== 13 March ===
List of shipwrecks: 13 March 1802
Ship	State	Description
Agnes	Batavian Republic	The ship was holed by her anchors and sank on the Middle Ground in the North Sea. Her crew were rescued. She was on a voyage from Rotterdam, South Holland to Leith, Lothian, United Kingdom.

=== 14 March ===
List of shipwrecks: 14 March 1802
Ship	State	Description
Caroline	Denmark–Norway	The ship was wrecked near Gravelines, Nord, France. She was on a voyage from Zant, Septinsular Republic.
Little Betsey	United Kingdom	The ship collided with the pier at Dover, Kent, and sank. She was on a voyage from Boston, Lincolnshire, to Weymouth, Dorset. Her crew were rescued.

=== 16 March ===
List of shipwrecks: 16 March 1802
Ship	State	Description
Atlantic	United Kingdom	The full-rigged ship was driven ashore and wrecked at Port Royal, Jamaica.
Hannah	United Kingdom	The ship was wrecked in Buckner's Bay, Jamaica.
Jamaica	(United Kingdom of Great Britain and Ireland) British North America	The full-rigged ship was driven ashore and wrecked at Port Royal.
Two Brothers	United Kingdom	The brig was driven ashore and wrecked at Port Royal.
William	United States	The brig was driven ashore and wrecked at Port Royal.

=== 19 March ===
List of shipwrecks: 19 March 1802
Ship	State	Description
Frederick George	United States	The ship was abandoned in the Atlantic Ocean. Her crew were rescued by Duke of Kent (United Kingdom). She was on a voyage from Virginia to Madeira.

=== 20 March ===
List of shipwrecks: 20 March 1802
Ship	State	Description
Sophia	Denmark	The ship was driven ashore at Bordeaux, Gironde, France. She was on a voyage from Lisbon, Portugal, to Bordeaux.

=== 21 March ===
List of shipwrecks: 21 March 1802
Ship	State	Description
Robert & Ann	United Kingdom	The ship was wrecked on Stroma, Caithness with the loss of two of her crew.
Terry	United Kingdom	The ship was wrecked near Stromness, Orkney Islands, while on a voyage from Belfast, County Down, to Danzig.

=== 22 March ===
List of shipwrecks: 22 March 1802
Ship	State	Description
Caroline	United Kingdom	The ship foundered in the Atlantic Ocean (57°50′N 8°50′W). Her crew survived. She was on a voyage from Dublin to a Norwegian port.

=== 23 March ===
List of shipwrecks: 23 March 1802
Ship	State	Description
Janus	United Kingdom	The packet ship foundered in the English Channel while on a voyage from Torbay, Devon, to Truro, Cornwall.

=== 25 March ===
List of shipwrecks: 25 March 1802
Ship	State	Description
Norfolk	United Kingdom	The brig was deliberately run aground in Matavai Bay in Tahiti during a hurricane to avoid her being smashed on rocks. Her crew survived and later was picked up by the 12-gun sloop-of-war HMS Porpoise (Royal Navy). Her hull later was salvaged, but sank as it was being towed to another island.

=== 26 March ===
List of shipwrecks: 26 March 1802
Ship	State	Description
Hannah	United Kingdom	The ship was lost in Buckner's Bay, Jamaica.

=== 28 March ===
List of shipwrecks: 28 March 1802
Ship	State	Description
Jeune Jan	France	The ship was wrecked near Saint-Valery-sur-Somme, Somme.
Lord Milton	United Kingdom	The ship was wrecked on the Domesnes Reef while on a voyage from Hull, Yorkshire, to Riga, Russia. Her crew survived.

=== 29 March ===
List of shipwrecks: 29 March 1802
Ship	State	Description
HMS Assistance	Royal Navy	The Portland-class ship of the line was wrecked in the North Sea off Dunkirk, Nord, France, with the loss of two of her crew.
Caroline	United States	The schooner departed Sydney, New South Wales for New Bedford, Massachusetts. No further trace, presumed foundered with the loss of all hands.
Nossa Senhora da Conceição Valorosa	Portugal	The ship was destroyed by fire in the Atlantic Ocean (25°36′N 26°03′W). Her 62 crew were rescued by Susannah (United Kingdom). She was on a voyage from Lisbon to Maranham, Brazil.

=== Unknown date ===
List of shipwrecks: Unknown date in March 1802
Ship	State	Description
Anna Elizabeth	United Kingdom	The ship ran aground on the Longsand, in the North Sea off the coast of Essex. She was on a voyage from Bergen, Norway to Bordeaux, Gironde, France. She was refloated and taken in to Whitstable, Kent.
Aurora	United Kingdom	The ship was driven ashore 12 nautical miles (22 km) from Greenock, Renfrewshire, and was wrecked. She was on a voyage from the Clyde to Trinidad.
Betty	United Kingdom	The ship was wrecked at Penarth, Glamorgan, while on a voyage from Bristol, Gloucestershire, to Liverpool, Lancashire.
Brilliant	United Kingdom	The ship struck a sunken wreck in Dublin Bay and sank. She was on a voyage from Dublin to Cork.
Brothers	United Kingdom	The brig was driven ashore and wrecked at Holyhead, Anglesey with the loss of all hands. She was on a voyage from Lisbon, Portugal, to Liverpool.
Desir de la Paix	(United Kingdom of Great Britain and Ireland) Guernsey	The ship was wrecked in the River Avon, Bristol. She was on a voyage from Bristol to Guernsey.
Dispatch	United Kingdom	The ship sprang a leak and was beached on the Yorkshire coast.
Eendracht	Batavian Republic	The ship was abandoned in the North Sea off Orford Ness, Suffolk, United Kingdom. She was later taken in to Orford Ness.
Elizabeth	United Kingdom	The ship sprang a leak and was beached at Glasgow, Renfrewshire. She was on a voyage from Glasgow to Dublin.
Frederick	United Kingdom	The ship foundered in the North Sea off Robin Hood's Bay, Yorkshire.
Governor Dowdswell	United Kingdom	The ship was driven ashore in Bootle Bay. She was on a voyage from Demerara to Liverpool.
Hope	United Kingdom	The ship ran aground on the Arklow Banks, in the Irish Sea and was abandoned by her crew. she subsequently refloated herself and was towed in to Milford, Pembrokeshire, by Ephren (United Kingdom).
Jenny	United Kingdom	The ship was wrecked on the Dutch coast.
Margaret	United Kingdom	The sloop foundered in the English Channel off Poole, Dorset, while on a voyage from Berwick-upon-Tweed, Northumberland to Poole.
Maria Joses	Spain	The ship was wrecked on the Spanish coast while on a voyage from St. Andero to Montevideo, Spanish Empire.
Mary	United Kingdom	The ship ran aground on the Goodwin Sands, Kent. She was refloated and taken in to The Downs.
Nancy	United Kingdom	The ship foundered.
Neptune	United Kingdom	The brig was wrecked on the Welsh coast with the loss of seven of her crew. She was on a voyage from Barnstaple, Devon, to Bristol.
Ranger	United Kingdom	The ship was lost off New Providence, Bahamas. She was on a voyage from London to New Providence.
Sophia	United Kingdom	The ship foundered in the Bristol Channel off Aberthaw, Glamorgan. Her crew were rescued. She was on a voyage from Bristol to Dublin.
Star	United Kingdom	The brig capsized off Uddevalla, Sweden. She was on a voyage from Danzig to Aberdeen.
Susannah	United Kingdom	The ship was driven ashore at Bristol. She was on a voyage from Cork to Bristol.
Russel	United Kingdom	The ship was holed by her anchor and sank at Den Helder, North Holland, Batavian Republic. Her crew were rescued. She was on a voyage from Sunderland, County Durham, to Amsterdam, North Holland. She was later refloated.
Triton	United Kingdom	The ship was driven ashore and wrecked at Mile House, Liverpool. She was on a voyage from Liverpool to Africa.
True Love	United Kingdom	The ship was wrecked at St. Ives, Cornwall.

== April ==
=== 2 April ===
List of shipwrecks: 2 April 1802
Ship	State	Description
Alexander	United Kingdom	The ship was driven on to the Whitton Sand, in the Humber and capsized.

=== 3 April ===
List of shipwrecks: 3 April 1802
Ship	State	Description
HMS Juste	Royal Navy	The ship of the line ran aground on the Asia Rock, off Plymouth, Devon. She was on a voyage from Portsmouth, Hampshire to Plymouth. She was refloated and taken in to Hamoaze.

=== 4 April ===
List of shipwrecks: 4 April 1802
Ship	State	Description
HMS Suffolk	Royal Navy	The third rate ran aground at Sheerness, Kent. She was refloated with assistance and taken in to Chatham, Kent.

=== 5 April ===
List of shipwrecks: 5 April 1802
Ship	State	Description
Ned	United States	The ship departed from Trinidad for Baltimore, Maryland. Ho further trace, presumed foundered with the loss of all hands.

=== 7 April ===
List of shipwrecks: 7 April 1802
Ship	State	Description
Juliana	United Kingdom	The brig foundered off Bencoolen, Sumatra with the loss of 22 of the 31 people on board.

=== 10 April ===
List of shipwrecks: 10 April 1802
Ship	State	Description
Fortitude	United Kingdom	The ship was wrecked on the coast of Caithness while on a voyage from Liverpool, Lancashire, to a Baltic port. Her crew survived.
Houghton	United Kingdom	The ship was wrecked on the Anholt Reef while on a voyage from Liverpool to Riga, Russian Empire. Her crew survived.

=== 11 April ===
List of shipwrecks: 11 April 1802
Ship	State	Description
Ferry	United Kingdom	The brigantine was driven ashore on the west coast of Mainland, Orkney Islands, and was wreckeed with the loss of a crew member. She was on a voyage from Belfast, County Down, to Danzig.
Swan	United Kingdom	The ship was wrecked on Stroma with the loss of three of her crew. She was on a voyage from Liverpool, Lancashire, to a Baltic port.

=== 12 April ===
List of shipwrecks: 12 April 1802
Ship	State	Description
Bangalore	United Kingdom	Loss of the Bangalore, Capt Lynch, on a Coral Reef in the Indian Sea (painting by Thomas Tegg) The ship was wrecked in the Flores Sea.

=== 13 April ===
List of shipwrecks: 13 April 1802
Ship	State	Description
Busy	United Kingdom	The ship foundered in the North Sea while on a voyage from Gothenburg, Sweden, to Leith, Lothian. Her crew were rescued by Fortune (United Kingdom)

=== 15 April ===
List of shipwrecks: 15 April 1802
Ship	State	Description
Jason	United States	The ship was wrecked in the Shetland Islands, United Kingdom, while on a voyage from New York to Hull, Yorkshire, United Kingdom.

=== 16 April ===
List of shipwrecks: 16 April 1802
Ship	State	Description
Nymph	United States	The schooner was wrecked off Cape Lookout, North Carolina with the loss of eight of the nine people on board. She was on a voyage from Philadelphia, Pennsylvania, to Charleston, South Carolina.

=== 20 April ===
List of shipwrecks: 16 April 1802
Ship	State	Description
Drie Geboeders	Prussia	The ship departed from Dover, Kent, United Kingdom, for Emden. No further trace, presumed foundered in the North Sea with the loss of all hands.

=== 22 April ===
List of shipwrecks: 22 April 1802
Ship	State	Description
Unnamed	Sweden	The ship ran aground on the Goodwin Sands, Kent, United Kingdom.

=== 23 April ===
List of shipwrecks: 23 April 1802
Ship	State	Description
Princess	United Kingdom	The ship was driven ashore at Beachy Head, Sussex. She was refloated but later lost her rudder and was driven ashore again. Her crew were rescued. Princess was on a voyage from Smyrna, Ottoman Empire, to London.

=== 24 April ===
List of shipwrecks: 24 April 1802
Ship	State	Description
Crown	United Kingdom	The ship struck a rock off Gothenburg, Sweden. She put into Gothenburg in a waterlogged condition.
Leda	United Kingdom	The ship was lost off British Honduras. She was on a voyage from London to British Honduras.

=== 25 April ===
List of shipwrecks: 25 April 1802
Ship	State	Description
Charming Eliza	United Kingdom	The ship sprang a leak and was abandoned in the Atlantic Ocean. Her crew were rescued by Undaunted (United Kingdom). She was on a voyage from Demerara to New Providence, New Jersey, United States and London.

=== Unknown date ===
List of shipwrecks: Unknown date in April 1802
Ship	State	Description
Acorn	United Kingdom	The ship was lost near Halmstadt, Sweden. Her crew were rescued. She was on a voyage from London to Memel, Prussia.
Constant	United Kingdom	The ship was driven ashore and wrecked on the coast of Lincolnshire. She was on a voyage from Liverpool, Lancashire, to Morlaix, Finistère, France.
Crown Prince Frederick	Denmark	The ship was driven ashore near Boulogne, Pas-de-Calais, France. She was on a voyage from Genoa to Saint Petersburg, Russia.
Eagle	United Kingdom	The ship foundered in the Mediterranean Sea while on a voyage from Gibraltar to Malta.
Edward	United Kingdom	The ship was driven ashore in the Orkney Islands and was severely damaged. She was later refloated and put into South Shields, County Durham, for repairs.
Elizabeth	United Kingdom	The ship was wrecked at Memel.
Fortuna	Prussia	The ship was driven ashore and wrecked at Memel while on a voyage from Memel to Liverpool, Lancashire United Kingdom.
Harmony	United Kingdom	The ship was lost near the Kole. She was on a voyage from Great Yarmouth, Norfolk, to Pillau, Prussia.
Kitty	United Kingdom	The ship was driven ashore and wrecked at Great Yarmouth.
Margaret	United Kingdom	The ship was wrecked on the coast of Jutland, Denmark. She was on a voyage from London to Stolp.
Ned	United States	The ship departed from Trinidad for Baltimore, Maryland. No further trace, presumed foundered in the Atlantic Ocean with the loss of all hands.
Stains	United Kingdom	The ship was wrecked on the Haisborough Sands, in the North Sea off the coast of Norfolk while on a voyage from Hull to London.
Tagus	United Kingdom	The ship was wrecked on The Swin, in the North Sea. She was on a voyage from Arbroath, Forfarshire, to London.
Tiviot	United Kingdom	The ship ran aground on The Shingles, Isle of Wight, while bound for the West Inies. She was later refloated and taken in to Tor Bay.
Twee Gyesberts	Hamburg	The ship was driven ashore near Dover, Kent, United Kingdom. She was on a voyage from Altona to Batavia, Dutch East Indies. She was refloated and taken in to Ramsgate, Kent.
Whim	United Kingdom	The ship was wrecked on the coast of Jutland while on a voyage from Liverpool to Pärnu, Russia.
William & Henry	United Kingdom	The ship ran aground on the Herd Sand, in the North Sea off the coast of County Durham. Her crew were rescued. She was on a voyage from Memel to South Shields.

== May ==
=== 9 May ===
List of shipwrecks: 9 May 1802
Ship	State	Description
Janet	United Kingdom	The sloop ran aground on the Oxears Rocks, in the Firth of Forth, and was severely damaged. She was on a voyage from Alemouth, Northumberland to Alloa, Clackmannanshire.

=== 10 May ===
List of shipwrecks: 10 May 1802
Ship	State	Description
Clara	United Kingdom	The ship departed from Tenerife, Canary Islands, for Saint Croix. No further trace, presumed foundered in the Atlantic Ocean with the loss of all hands.
HMS Netley	Royal Navy	The schooner ran aground 2 nautical miles (3.7 km) south of Eyemouth, Berwickshire. She was refloated.

=== 12 May ===
List of shipwrecks: 12 May 1802
Ship	State	Description
Union	United Kingdom	The ship was run down in the North Sea 8 leagues (24 nautical miles (44 km)) off Vlieland, Friesland, Batavian Republic, by Friendship (Denmark–Norway) and sunk. There were three survivors.

=== 13 May ===
List of shipwrecks: 13 May 1802
Ship	State	Description
Caroline	Batavian Republic	The ship ran aground on the Long Sand, in the North Sea off the coast of Essex, United Kingdom and was abandoned by her crew. She was on a voyage from Amsterdam, North Holland to Genoa. She was later refloated and brought in to Whitstable, Kent, United Kingdom.
Neptune	United Kingdom	The ship was driven ashore at Whitby, Yorkshire. She was refloated on 16 May and taken in to Whitby in a severely damaged state.
Triton	United Kingdom	The ship foundered in the Atlantic Ocean 10 leagues (30 nautical miles (56 km)) west of the Isles of Scilly with the loss of six of her nine crew. She was on a voyage from Boston, Massachusetts, United States, to Plymouth, Devon.

=== 14 May ===
List of shipwrecks: 14 May 1802
Ship	State	Description
Fly	United Kingdom	The brig departed Calcutta for Sydney, New South Wales. No further trace, presumed foundered with the loss of all hands.
Maria	United Kingdom	The ship was discovered abandoned and taken in to Livorno, Grand Duchy of Tuscany. She had been on a voyage from Naples to Livorno.

=== 18 May ===
List of shipwrecks: 18 May 1802
Ship	State	Description
Fame	United Kingdom	The ship struck a rock and sank in the Saint Lawrence River at Duchambeau, Quebec, British North America. She was on a voyage from London to Montreal, Quebec.

=== 22 May ===
List of shipwrecks: 22 May 1802
Ship	State	Description
Marquis of Carmarthen	United Kingdom	The ship was wrecked on Miquelon. Her crew were rescued. She was on a voyage from London to Picton, Ontario, British North America.

=== 23 May ===
List of shipwrecks: 23 May 1802
Ship	State	Description
Industry	United States	The ship departed Málaga, Spain, for Lisbon. Portugal. No further trace, presumed foundered with the loss of all hands.

=== 29 May ===
List of shipwrecks: 29 May 1802
Ship	State	Description
John and Peggy	United Kingdom	The sloop sprang a leak 6 nautical miles (11 km) north of Islay and sank. Her four crew were rescued by Dykes (United Kingdom).

=== Unknown date ===
List of shipwrecks: Unknown date in May 1802
Ship	State	Description
Anna Catherina	Hamburg	The ship was driven ashore on Scharhörn. She was on a voyage from Hamburg to Gibraltar.
Banzalore	United Kingdom	The ship was wrecked on a shoal in the Pacific Ocean (7°33′N 120°45′E).
Constanza	Spain	The ship was wrecked on the coast of Corsica, France.
Cupid	Stettin	The ship was crushed by ice and sunk in the Baltic Sea while on a voyage from Stettin, to Saint Petersburg, Russia.
Daphne	United Kingdom	The ship foundered in the Atlantic Ocean off St. John's, Newfoundland, British North America. She was on a voyage from the Clyde to Newfoundland. Her crew were rescued by Liberty (United States).
Diamond	United Kingdom	The ship was driven ashore and wrecked near Barcelona, Spain.
Eagle	United Kingdom	The ship was wrecked on the coast of Calabria, Spain, while on a voyage from Falmouth, Cornwall, to a Mediterranean port via Cádiz, Spain.
Fame	United Kingdom	The ship was driven ashore at Hogeness, Sweden, while on a voyage from Danzig to Londonderry. She was later refloated and taken in to Hogeness.
George	(United Kingdom of Great Britain and Ireland) Guernsey	The ship was wrecked on an island off the coast of France.
George	United Kingdom	The ship foundered in the Atlantic Ocean off St, John's, Newfoundland. Her crew were rescued by Liberty (United States). She was on a voyage from London to Newfoundland.
Lancaster	United Kingdom	The ship was driven ashore at Danzig while on a voyage from Danzig to Liverpool.
Rasper	United Kingdom	The ship was wrecked at Cork while on a voyage from Cork to Falmouth, Cornwall.
Rattler	United Kingdom	The ship was wrecked on Gotland, Sweden. She was on a voyage from London to Saint Petersburg.
Recovery	United Kingdom	The ship sprang a leak in the North Sea and was beached at Cleethorpes, Lincolnshire. She was later refloated and taken in to the Humber.
Success	United Kingdom	The ship was driven ashore and wrecked at "Serochis", on the Mediterranean coast. She was on a voyage from London to Livorno, Grand Duchy of Tuscany.
Washington	Danish Asiatic Company	The East Indiaman was wrecked on the Norwegian coast. She was on a voyage from Calcutta, India, to Copenhagen.
Witham	United Kingdom	The ship was driven ashore at Great Yarmouth, Norfolk. She was on a voyage from Boston, Lincolnshire, to London.
Unnamed	{flag unknown	The ship was wrecked at Saint-Valery-sur-Somme, Somme, France in early May.

== June ==
=== 13 June ===
List of shipwrecks: 13 June 1802
Ship	State	Description
Calcutta	United Kingdom	The transport ship was wrecked on the coast of Egypt with the loss of seven of the 410 people on board. Survivors were rescued by HMS Romney (Royal Navy).

=== 17 June ===
List of shipwrecks: 17 June 1802
Ship	State	Description
Bell	United Kingdom	The brig sprang a leak off Nevis and was beached. She became a total loss. Bell was on a voyage from Montserrat to a British port.

=== 18 June ===
List of shipwrecks: 18 June 1802
Ship	State	Description
HMS Plover	Royal Navy	The sloop-of-war ran aground on the Apegado Reef. She was later refloated but was found to be severely damaged. She was subsequently repaired and returned to service.

=== 20 June ===
List of shipwrecks: 20 June 1802
Ship	State	Description
Trelawney	United Kingdom	The ship capsized in the River Mersey at Liverpool, Lancashire. She was bound for an African port. She was later refloated.

=== 30 June ===
List of shipwrecks: 30 June 1802
Ship	State	Description
Millbrook	United Kingdom	The schooner departed from Gibraltar for Lisbon, Portugal. No further trace, presumed foundered in the Atlantic Ocean with the loss of all hands.

=== Unknown date ===
List of shipwrecks: Unknown date in June 1802
Ship	State	Description
Betsey	(United Kingdom of Great Britain and Ireland) Jersey	The ship was lost in the Strait of Belle Isle. She was on a voyage from Jersey to Labrador, British North America.
Confianza	United Kingdom	The transport ship was wrecked on the coast of Corsica, France.
Diana	United Kingdom	The schooner was wrecked on the coast of the Isle of Pines, Captaincy General of Cuba. She was on a voyage from Jamaica to Liverpool, Lancashire.
Duke of Portland	United States	The whaler was wrecked at Tongatapu. Those on board survived, however, the natives murdered all but one woman, who was rescued in 1804.
Felia	Sweden	The ship was in collision with another vessel in the English Channel off the Isle of Wight. She was consequently beached at Cowes, Isle of Wight. Felia was on a voyage from Málaga, Spain, to Stockholm.
George	United Kingdom	The ship was wrecked on the coast of Lincolnshire.
Good Friends	(United Kingdom of Great Britain and Ireland) Jersey	The ship was lost in the Strait of Belle Isle. She was on a voyage from Jersey to Labrador.
Goodintent	United Kingdom	The ship was lost near Nieuwpoort, Lys, France. She was on a voyage from Hull, Yorkshire, to Dunkirk, Nord, France.
Henry	United Kingdom	The ship was lost near "the Ross", Scotland.
John Bull	United Kingdom	The ship was lost at St. Thomas's, Africa.
Lady Henrietta	Hamburg	The ship was lost near Texel, North Holland, Batavian Republic. She was on a voyage from Le Havre, Seine-Inférieure, France, to Hamburg.
Perseverance	United Kingdom	The ship ran aground in the River Bann and was wrecked. She was on a voyage from Gothenburg, Sweden, to Coleraine, County Antrim.
Rhoda	United Kingdom	The ship was driven ashore and wrecked on the coast of Jutland. Her crew were rescued. She was on a voyage from Newcastle upon Tyne, Northumberland, to Wismar, Swedish Pomerania.
São José e Nossa Senhora da Conceição	Portugal	The ship was lost off the Cape Verde Islands in early June.
St. Olof	Sweden	The ship was driven ashore on the Sandwich Flats. She was on a voyage from Stockholm to Lisbon, Portugal.
Two Brothers	United Kingdom	The ship ran aground on the Goodwin Sands, Kent. She was on a voyage from a Norwegian port ot Dublin. She was refloated and taken in to The Downs.

== July ==
=== 2 July ===
List of shipwrecks: 2 July 1802
Ship	State	Description
La Themis	France	The ship foundered in the Atlantic Ocean with the loss of her captain. Survivors were rescued by Hebe (United Kingdom). La Themis was on a voyage from Cayenne to La Rochelle, Charente-Maritime.

=== 4 July ===
List of shipwrecks: 4 July 1802
Ship	State	Description
Peace and Plenty	United Kingdom	The ship foundered in the Baltic Sea off Gotland, Sweden, with the loss of four of her ten crew. The survivors were rescued by a Danish sloop. She was on a voyage from Riga, Russia, to Rotterdam, South Holland, Batavian Republic.
Philadelphia	United States	The ship ran aground in the Scheldt at Antwerp, Deux-Nèthes, France, and was wrecked.

=== 9 July ===
List of shipwrecks: 9 July 1802
Ship	State	Description
Phæton	United Kingdom	The ship was wrecked at Boon's Point, Antigua. Her crew were rescued. She was on a voyage from the Isle of May to Saint Thomas, Virgin Islands.

=== 10 July ===
List of shipwrecks: 10 July 1802
Ship	State	Description
Union	United States	The ship was wrecked on the Isle of Sable. She was on a voyage from Alicante, Spain, to Boston, Massachusetts.

=== 12 July ===
List of shipwrecks: 12 July 1802
Ship	State	Description
Hope	United States	The brig foundered in the Atlantic Ocean. Her crew were rescued.

=== 13 July ===
List of shipwrecks: 13 July 1802
Ship	State	Description
Butterworth	United Kingdom	The whaler foundered off Spanish Town, Jamaica, with the loss of a crew member. She was on a voyage from London to the South Seas.

=== 14 July ===
List of shipwrecks: 14 July 1802
Ship	State	Description
Brita-Margarita (Брита-Маргарита)	Imperial Russian Navy	The transport ship was driven ashore and wrecked on Zapadny Beryozovy of Beryozovye Islands with the loss of one crew member.

=== 15 July ===
List of shipwrecks: 15 July 1802
Ship	State	Description
Henrica	Hamburg	The ship was driven ashore and wrecked on Texel, North Holland, Batavian Republic. Her crew were rescued. She was on a voyage from Hamburg to London, United Kingdom.

=== 18 July ===
List of shipwrecks: 18 July 1802
Ship	State	Description
Brothers	United States	The brig was wrecked on the coast of "Montmusson". Her crew were rescued.

=== 19 July ===
List of shipwrecks: 19 July 1802
Ship	State	Description
Diana	United Kingdom	The ship was wrecked on the Isla de la Juventud, Cuba. She was on a voyage from Jamaica to Liverpool, Lancashire.

=== 21 July ===
List of shipwrecks: 21 July 1802
Ship	State	Description
Ann	United Kingdom	The ship was driven ashore near Cádiz, Spain. She was on a voyage from Liverpool, Lancashire, to Genoa.
Apollo	United States	The ship foundered in Carnarvon Bay with the loss of all hands. She was on a voyage from Nantucket, Massachusetts, to Liverpool.

=== 22 July ===
List of shipwrecks: 22 July 1802
Ship	State	Description
Two unnamed gunboats	Ottoman Tripolitania	First Barbary War: Two Tripolitan gunboats were reportedly sunk by USS Constellation (United States Navy) off Tripoli.

=== 23 July ===
List of shipwrecks: 23 July 1802
Ship	State	Description
Martin	United Kingdom	The ship was wrecked on the Newcombe Sand, in the North Sea off Lowestoft, Suffolk She was on a voyage from London to Newcastle-upon-Tyne, Northumberland.
Nimble	United Kingdom	The packet boat was in collision with another vessel and foundered in the English Channel off Plymouth, Devon, with the loss of 70 of the 71 people on board.

=== 24 July ===
List of shipwrecks: 24 July 1802
Ship	State	Description
Dalrymple	United Kingdom	The ship was wrecked on Red Island, in the Saint Lawrence River, British North America. She was on a voyage from Barbados to Quebec City, Lower Canada, British North America.

=== Unknown date ===
List of shipwrecks: Unknown date in July 1802
Ship	State	Description
Apparancen	Sweden	The ship was wrecked on Saaremaa. She was on a voyage from Marstrand to Narva, Russia.
Ariel	United States	The ship struck a submerged rock at Dunkirk, Nord, France, and was a total loss. She was on a voyage from Baltimore, Maryland, to Dunkirk.
Betsey	United Kingdom	The ship foundered in Studland Bay, Dorset, with the loss of all three crew. She was on a voyage from Swanage, Dorset, to Arundel, Sussex.
Cestus	United Kingdom	The ship was lost near Riga, Russia. She was on a voyage from Liverpool, Lancashire, to Pärnu, Russia.
De Koster	Prussia	The ship was driven ashore in the Ems and wrecked. She was on a voyage from La Guayra to Emden.
Delaware	United States	The ship was driven ashore and wrecked in the Scheldt. She was on a voyage from Philadelphia, Pennsylvania, to Antwerp, Deux-Nèthes, France.
Eliza	United Kingdom	The ship was wrecked at Nantes, Loire-Inférieure with the loss of six lives. She was on a voyage from Saint Sebastian to Nantes.
Freundschaft	Bremen	The ship sank in the Weser. She was on a voyage from Bayonne, Basses-Pyrénées, France, to Bremen.
Friends	United Kingdom	The ship was wrecked on Inchcape. Her crew were rescued. She was on a voyage from Greenock, Renfrewshire, to Hamburg.
Hope	United Kingdom	The ship foundered at the mouth of the Weser. Her crew were rescued. She was on a voyage from Bremen to London.
Lively	United Kingdom	The ship foundered in Carnarvon Bay with the loss of all hands. She was on a voyage from London to Liverpool.
Lord Dundas	United Kingdom	The ship was wrecked 6 nautical miles (11 km) from Barcelona, Spain. She was on a voyage from Hamburg to Barcelona.
Two Brothers	United Kingdom	The ship was driven ashore in Studland Bay.

== August ==
=== 7 August ===
List of shipwrecks: 7 August 1802
Ship	State	Description
Fraternité	French Navy	The frigate departed from Saint-Domingue. No further trace, presumed foundered with the loss of all hands.

=== 8 August ===
List of shipwrecks: 8 August 1802
Ship	State	Description
Adventure	United Kingdom	The brig foundered in the English Channel off Brighton, Sussex. She was on a voyage from Great Yarmouth, Norfolk, to Livorno, Grand Duchy of Tuscany. Barratry was suspected to be the cause, which was proved by an inspection of the wreck, which was raised and beached at Brighton.

=== 13 August ===
List of shipwrecks: 13 August 1802
Ship	State	Description
Frederickshall	Flag unknown	The ship was wrecked on the Snow Bank, in the North Sea off Dunkirk, Nord, France.

=== 21 August ===
List of shipwrecks: 21 August 1802
Ship	State	Description
Ex	United Kingdom	The ship was wrecked neat Saint Petersburg, Russia. Her crew were rescued.

=== 23 August ===
List of shipwrecks: 23 August 1802
Ship	State	Description
Ann	United Kingdom	The ship was wrecked at the Point of Consel, Renfrewshire. All on board were rescued She was on a voyage from Greenock, Renfrewshire to Liverpool, Lancashire.

=== 25 August ===
List of shipwrecks: 25 August 1802
Ship	State	Description
Minerva	France	The ship foundered. Her crew were rescued by Fanny (United States).

=== 28 August ===
List of shipwrecks: 28 August 1802
Ship	State	Description
Greenock	United Kingdom	The ship was wrecked at Arkhangelsk, Russia. She was on a voyage from Arkhangelsk to Barcelona, Spain.

=== 29 August ===
List of shipwrecks: 29 August 1802
Ship	State	Description
Jong Fram	Batavian Republic	The ship was wrecked near Hellevoetsluis, Zeeland. Her crew were rescued. She was on a voyage from London, United Kingdom, to Rotterdam, South Holland.

=== 31 August ===
List of shipwrecks: 31 August 1802
Ship	State	Description
Albion Packet	United Kingdom	The schooner struck a rock at the mouth of the River Tweed. She was on a voyage from London to Leith, Lothian. She put in to Berwick upon Tweed, Northumberland.
Juno	United States	The ship was destroyed by fire off Portland, Dorset, United Kingdom. Her crew were rescued. She was on a voyage from Le Havre, Seine-Inférieure, France, to Cork, United Kingdom.

=== Unknown date ===
List of shipwrecks: Unknown date in August 1802
Ship	State	Description
Ann	United Kingdom	The ship was driven ashore at Corale Point. She was on a voyage from Greenock, Renfrewshire, to Liverpool, Lancashire.
Ann	United Kingdom	The ship departed from Arkhangelsk, Russia, for Bremen. No further trace, presumed foundered with the loss of all hands.
Daniel & Mary	United Kingdom	The ship was wrecked on Scroby Sands, Norfolk. Her crew were rescued. She was on a voyage from Hull, Yorkshire, to Great Yarmouth, Norfolk.
Dellemiellæ	Batavian Republic	The ship foundered in the North Sea with the loss of all but two of her crew. She was on a voyage from Amsterdam, North Holland to London, United Kingdom.
Hellen	United Kingdom	The ship was driven ashore and wrecked at Sligo.
Juffer Thana Anna Magdalena	Flag unknown	The ship was driven ashore 5 nautical miles (9.3 km) from Rouen, Seine-Inférieure, France. She was on a voyage from London to Rouen.
Loven	Hamburg	The ship Was lost off Westport, County Mayo, United Kingdom. Her crew were rescued. She was on a voyage from Altona, Hamburg, to Marseille, Bouches-du-Rhône, France.
Mary	Batavian Republic	The ship was wrecked near Cherbourg, Seine-Inférieure. Her crew were rescued. She was on a voyage from Rotterdam, South Holland to Africa.
Mercury	United Kingdom	The ship foundered in Sligo Bay.
Neptune	France	The ship was lost off Cape St. Vincent, Spain. Her crew were rescued. She was on a voyage from Cette, Hérault to Boulogne, Pas-de-Calais.
Roba & Betsey	United States	The ship was driven ashore near Nantes, Loire-Inférieure, France.
Young William	United Kingdom	The ship was driven ashore on Gotland, Sweden. She was on a voyage from Narva, Russia, to the River Wyre.

== September ==
=== 4 September ===
List of shipwrecks: 4 September 1802
Ship	State	Description
Traveller	(United Kingdom of Great Britain and Ireland) Guernsey	The brig was abandoned in the Irish Sea 10 leagues (30 nautical miles (56 km)) off Cork while on a voyage from Cork to London. Her crew were rescued. She was later found off Ballycotton, County Cork.

=== 5 September ===
List of shipwrecks: 5 September 1802
Ship	State	Description
Aurora	Portugal	The ship was destroyed by an explosion at Madeira with the loss of 32 of her 34 crew.

=== 6 September ===
List of shipwrecks: 6 September 1802
Ship	State	Description
Benevolence	United Kingdom	The ship was wrecked in the Isle of Jura. She was on a voyage from the Clyde to Wiscasset, Maine, United States.

=== 10 September ===
List of shipwrecks: 10 September 1802
Ship	State	Description
HMS Diamond	Royal Navy	The Artois-class frigate ran aground off Texel, North Holland, Batavian Republic. She was on a voyage from Guernsey, Channel Islands to Texel. She was refloated.
Eleanor	United Kingdom	The brig was driven ashore and wrecked at Margate, Kent. She was on a voyage from London to Portsmouth, Hampshire.
HMS Fortuna	Royal Navy	The ship ran aground off Texel. She was on a voyage from Guernsey to Texel. All on board were taken ashore as she was severely leaky.

=== 14 September ===
List of shipwrecks: 14 September 1802
Ship	State	Description
Four Brothers	United Kingdom	The ship was driven ashore and wrecked at Workington, Cumberland. She was on a voyage from Limerick to Liverpool, Lancashire.

=== 17 September ===
List of shipwrecks: 17 September 1802
Ship	State	Description
Four Brothers	United Kingdom	The ship was wrecked at Workington, Cumberland, while on a voyage from Limerick to South Shields, County Durham. Her crew were rescued.
Mentor	United Kingdom	The brig foundered at Cythera while on a voyage from Athens, Greece, to Malta. She had some of the Elgin Marbles on board, which were later salvaged.

=== 20 September ===
List of shipwrecks: 20 September 1802
Ship	State	Description
Swan	United Kingdom	The brig was wrecked in the Bocas Islands.
Van Holten	United States	The ship parted company with Galgo (United States) in the Atlantic Ocean (41°06′N 56°30′W). No further trace, presumed foundered with the loss of all hands. Van Holten was on a voyage from Charleston, South Carolina, to Liverpool, Lancashire, United Kingdom.

=== 23 September ===
List of shipwrecks: 23 September 1802
Ship	State	Description
HMS Pomone	Royal Navy	The frigate struck a rock in St Aubin's Bay, Jersey, Channel Islands, and sank. She was later refloated but was declared a constructive total loss.

=== 28 September ===
List of shipwrecks: 28 September 1802
Ship	State	Description
Newham	United Kingdom	The brig caught fire at Plymouth, Devon. She consequently exploded and sank. Her crew had abandoned ship before her loss. Newham was on a voyage from London to Falmouth, Cornwall

=== 29 September ===
List of shipwrecks: 29 September 1802
Ship	State	Description
Middleton	United States	The ship departed from Charleston, South Carolina, for Havana, Cuba. She had not arrived by 3 November.

=== 30 September ===
List of shipwrecks: 30 September 1802
Ship	State	Description
Gamble Norge	Denmark	The ship was wrecked near Fladstrand. She was on a voyage from Saint Croix to Copenhagen.

=== Unknown date ===
List of shipwrecks: Unknown date in September 1802
Ship	State	Description
Amazon	France	The ship was lost at "Carrière".
Ann	United Kingdom	The ship sank on Scroby Sands, Norfolk. Her crew were rescued.
Bloomstrande Blomen	Flag unknown	The ship was destroyed by fire at Lisbon, Portugal. She was on a voyage from Spain to London, United Kingdom.
Cora	Batavian Republic	The ship was driven ashore on the "Kruys Islands", in the White Sea. She was on a voyage from Arkhangelsk, Russia, to Amsterdam, North Holland.
Eliza	United Kingdom	The ship was driven ashore and wrecked on Newfoundland, British North America with the loss of about half of her crew.
Elizabeth	United Kingdom	The ship was lost at Newfoundland. She was on a voyage from Nova Scotia to Newfoundland.
Flora	United Kingdom	The ship was driven ashore at the mouth of the River Shannon. She was on a voyage from Limerick to South Shields, County Durham. She was later refloated.
Hind	United Kingdom	The ship was wrecked on the Swedish coast. She was on a voyage from Saint Petersburg, Russia, to Londonderry.
Jean	United Kingdom	The ship was driven ashore and wrecked near Reval, Russia. She was on a voyage from Saint Petersburg to Greenock, Renfrewshire.
John	United Kingdom	The ship was run down and sunk by George (United Kingdom) in the North Sea off Whitby, Yorkshire. Her crew were rescued by George.
La Bonne Adventure	France	The ship foundered in the Atlantic Ocean off the Cape Verde Islands, Portugal while on a voyage from Bordeaux, Loire-Inférieure to Buenos Aires.
Lady Nelson	United Kingdom	The ship ran aground on the Arklow Bank, in the Irish Sea off the coast of County Wicklpw. She was refloated but became waterlogged.
L'Etoile de la Mer	France	The ship was wrecked on the Île d'Oléron. She was on a voyage from La Rochelle, Loire-Inférieure to Bordeaux, Gironde.
Maria	United Kingdom	The brig was wrecked on the French coast.
Maryann	United Kingdom	The ship was wrecked on the Runnel Stone. Her crew were rescued. She was on a voyage from Dartmouth, Devon, to Bristol, Gloucestershire.
Midsummer	United Kingdom	The ship was wrecked at Whitby, Yorkshire. Her crew were rescued. She was on a voyage from Sunderland, County Durham, to Whitby.
Rebecca	United Kingdom	The ship departed from Liverpool, Lancashire, for New York, United States. No further trace, presumed foundered in the Atlantic Ocean with the loss of all hands.
Thérèse	France	The ship was wrecked in the Îles des Saintes.
Young William	United Kingdom	The ship ran aground at "Cregil" (Crigyll), Anglesey, and was wrecked. Her crew were rescued.

== October ==
=== 1 October ===
List of shipwrecks: 1 October 1802
Ship	State	Description
Begona	United Kingdom	The ship was lost at the Cape of Good Hope.
Halicia	United Kingdom	The ship was lost near Ferryland, Newfoundland, British North America. She was on a voyage from Liverpool, Lancashire, to Newfoundland.

=== 3 October ===
List of shipwrecks: 3 October 1802
Ship	State	Description
Ann	United Kingdom	The sloop was run into by another vessel in Liverpool Bay with the loss of a crew member. She was abandoned by the survivors. She waws subsequently taken in to Liverpool, Lancashire.
Triton	United Kingdom	The ship was destroyed by fire off Lymington, Hampshire, with the loss of five of her crew. She was on a voyage from London to Liverpool.

=== 4 October ===
List of shipwrecks: 4 October 1802
Ship	State	Description
Ann	United Kingdom	The ship was driven ashore and wrecked near Heysham, Lancashire. Her crew were rescued. She was on a voyage from Dundalk, County Louth, to Liverpool, Lancashire.
L'Enterprise	(France) Mauritius	The schooner departed Port Jackson, New South Wales, for a seal hunting expedition in the Bass Strait. She was subsequently wrecked later in 1802 or in early 1803 on the Sister Islands in Bass Strait off Tasmania with the loss of her entire crew of 13.
Thames	United Kingdom	The West Indiaman capsized off St Catherine's Point, Isle of Wight with the loss of all hands.

=== 5 October ===
List of shipwrecks: 5 October 1802
Ship	State	Description
Generous Mind	United Kingdom	The sloop sprang a leak and foundered in the North Sea off the coast of Caithness. She was on a voyage from Helmsdale, Sutherland, to Wick, Caithness. Her crew survived.
Phœbe and Ann	United Kingdom	The barque was driven ashore and wrecked on the Mull of Kintyre, Argyllshire, while on a voyage from Dublin to Memel, Prussia. Her crew survived.

=== 6 October ===
List of shipwrecks: 6 October 1802
Ship	State	Description
Bell and Ann	United Kingdom	The sloop sprang a leak foundered in the North Sea south of St. Abb's Head, Berwickshire. She was on a voyage from Sunderland, County Durham, to Inverness. Her crew were rescued by Henry (United Kingdom).
Benevolence	United Kingdom	The ship was wrecked on Jura.

=== 9 October ===
List of shipwrecks: 9 October 1802
Ship	State	Description
Welcome Return	United States	The ship was wrecked on the Abacon Reef. Her crew were rescued. She was on a voyage from New York to New Orleans, New Spain.

=== 10 October ===
List of shipwrecks: 10 October 1802
Ship	State	Description
Two Brothers	United States	The ship ran aground off Yell, Shetland Islands, United Kingdom. She was on a voyage from Leith, Lothian to New York. She was refloated on 16 October and resumed her voyage.

=== 13 October ===
List of shipwrecks: 13 October 1802
Ship	State	Description
Louisa Bridger	United States	The ship departed from New York for Antigua. She had not arrived by 25 December, presumed lost.
Three Brothers	(United Kingdom of Great Britain and Ireland) Jersey	The ship departed from Labrador, British North America, for Jersey. She had not arrived by 11 February 1803, presumed foundered with the loss of all hands.

=== 15 October ===
List of shipwrecks: 15 October 1802
Ship	State	Description
Brothers	United Kingdom	The galiot was wrecked in the Orkney Islands while on a voyage from Leith, Lothian, to Liverpool, Lancashire. Her crew survived.

=== 17 October ===
List of shipwrecks: 17 October 1802
Ship	State	Description
Unnamed	United Kingdom	The smuggling lugger was driven ashore at Lytham St Annes, Lancashire by HMRC Pigmy (United Kingdom) and subsequently became a wreck. Her fifteen crew survived.

=== 19 October ===
List of shipwrecks: 19 October 1802
Ship	State	Description
Turin Galley	United Kingdom	The ship foundered in the Bay of Honduras. Her crew were rescued by Nestoe (United Kingdom). Turin Galley was on a voyage from British Honduras to London.

=== 20 October ===
List of shipwrecks: 20 October 1802
Ship	State	Description
Flora	United Kingdom	The ship was driven ashore and wrecked at Bilbao, Spain. She was on a voyage from Exeter, Devon, to Bilbao.
Union	United Kingdom	The ship was driven ashore and wrecked at Bilbao. She was on a voyage from Bristol, Gloucestershire, to Bilbao.

=== 21 October ===
List of shipwrecks: 21 October 1802
Ship	State	Description
Marlborough	United Kingdom	The ship ran aground on the Goodwin Sands, Kent. She was refloated and taken in to Broadstairs, Kent.

=== 25 October ===
List of shipwrecks: 25 October 1802
Ship	State	Description
Katy Kee	United States	The ship was wrecked on the Barngat Shoals.

=== 26 October ===
List of shipwrecks: 26 October 1802
Ship	State	Description
Sally	United Kingdom	The ship departed from Fishguard Bay for Teignmouth, Devon or Liverpool, Lancashire. No further trace, presumed foundered with the loss of all hands.
Swan	United Kingdom	The ship was driven ashore and wrecked at Dale, Pembrokeshire. She was on a voyage from Cork to Bristol, Gloucestershire.

=== 27 October ===
List of shipwrecks: 27 October 1802
Ship	State	Description
George	United Kingdom	The ship was driven ashore at Gotland, Sweden, while on a voyage from Saint Petersburg, Russia, to London. Her crew were rescued.

=== 28 October ===
List of shipwrecks: 28 October 1802
Ship	State	Description
Chatham	United Kingdom	The ship foundered in the English Channel off Eastbourne, Sussex, with the loss of all hands.
Experiment	United States	The ship was wrecked at Sandy Hook, New Jersey. Her crew were rescued. She was on a voyage from Antigua to New York.
Flora	United Kingdom	The ship was wrecked on Mallorca while on a voyage from Falmouth, Cornwall, to Livorno, Grand Duchy of Tuscany. Her crew were rescued.
Mary	United States	The full-rigged ship was driven ashore on the Barnegat Peninsula, New Jersey, while on a voyage from Amsterdam, North Holland, Batavian Republic, to New York. Her crew were rescued.
Nancy	United States	The ship was driven ashore in the Turks Islands. She was on a voyage from Virginia to Jamaica.

=== 29 October ===
List of shipwrecks: 29 October 1802
Ship	State	Description
Active	United Kingdom	The ship was wrecked on Gotland, Sweden. Her crew were rescued.

=== 31 October ===
List of shipwrecks: 31 October 1802
Ship	State	Description
Bellona	United States	The ship foundered while on a voyage from Cádiz, Spain, to New York.

=== Unknown date ===
List of shipwrecks: Unknown date in October 1802
Ship	State	Description
Active	United Kingdom	The ship was wrecked in the Orkney Islands. She was on a voyage from Danzig to Liverpool, Lancashire.
Alliance	United Kingdom	The ship foundered off Peel, Isle of Man while on a voyage from Jamaica to Liverpool, Lancashire. Her crew were rescued.
Alpha	United Kingdom	The ship was driven ashore. She was on a voyage from Lisbon, Portugal to Liverpool. She was refloated and taken in to Pwlhelli, Caernarfonshire.
Apollo	United Kingdom	The ship sprang a leak in the North Sea and was abandoned by her crew. She was on a voyage from Antwerp, Deux-Nèthes, France, to Newcastle upon Tyne, Northumberland.
Aurora	Portugal	The ship was destroyed by an onboard explosion at Madeira. She was on a voyage from Lisbon to Montevideo, Brazil
Ceres	United Kingdom	The ship was driven ashore between Hogenes and Kraperup, Sweden, and was wrecked. She was on a voyage from Memel, Prussia, to Hamburg.
Diligence	United Kingdom	The ship was driven ashore and wrecked at Lowestoft, Suffolk. Her crew were rescued.
Elizabeth	United Kingdom	The ship was wrecked near Swinemünde, Swedish Pomerania, She was on a voyage from Liverpool to Stettin.
Enterprize	(United Kingdom of Great Britain and Ireland) Bermuda	The ship foundered in the Atlantic Ocean (34°22′N 72°00′W with the loss of two of her crew.
Exeter	United Kingdom	The ship was lost in the Baltic Sea.
Five Brothers	United Kingdom	The sloop was wrecked on the Fairness Rock while on a voyage from Lyme, Dorset, to London.
Fortuna	United Kingdom	The ship was driven ashore in the Kattegat and was severely damaged. She was on a voyage from Memel to Great Yarmouth, Norfolk. Fortuna was later refloated and put into Copenhagen, Denmark, for repairs.
Hazen	United States	The ship was driven ashore at Hoylake, Cheshire, United Kingdom, while on a voyage from Massachusetts to Liverpool, Lancashire, United Kingdom.
Henry	United Kingdom	The ship was wrecked on the coast of Sweden.
Isabella	United Kingdom	The ship was wrecked on Bornholm, Denmark, while on a voyage from Danzig to Whitby, Yorkshire. Her crew were rescued.
Jacob	Batavian Republic	The ship was driven ashore and wrecked near Hellevoetsluis, Zeeland. she was on a voyage from Riga, Russia, to Schiedam.
James	United Kingdom	The ship ran aground on the Burbo Bank, in Liverpool Bay. She was on a voyage from Jamaica to Liverpool. She was refloated on 4 October and taken in to Liverpool.
La Vertude	Spain	The ship departed from Caracas, Viceroyalty of New Granada, for Spain. No further trace, presumed foundered with the loss of all hands.
Lycklan	(Sweden) Swedish Pomerania	The ship was wrecked on Bornholm, Denmark. She was on a voyage from Stralsund to Libava, Courland Governorate.
Mary	United Kingdom	The ship deported from a port in Nova Scotia, British North America, for London. No further trace, presumed foundered with the loss of all hands.
Minerva	Danzig	The ship was lost near Campbeltown, Argyllshire, United Kingdom. She was on a voyage from Norway to Dublin, United Kingdom
New Brunswick	United Kingdom	The ship sank at Ramsgate, Kent.
Nancy	(United Kingdom of Great Britain and Ireland) Guernsey	The ship foundered in the North Sea off Hellevoetsluis while on a voyage from Guernsey to Rotterdam, South Holland, Batavian Republic.
Octavia	United Kingdom	The ship foundered in the Mediterranean Sea off the coast of Spain. Her crew were rescued. Her crew were rescued. She was on a voyage from Spain to London.
Pearl	United Kingdom	The ship was wrecked on Anholt while on a voyage from Danzig to Hull, Yorkshire. Her crew were rescued.
Prosperity	United Kingdom	The ship was lost in the Orkney Islands. She was on a voyage from Norway to Dublin.
Royal Oak	United Kingdom	The ship was lost in the Baltic sea.
Samuel	United Kingdom	The ship was wrecked on the Norwegian coast. She was on a voyage from Arkhangelsk, Russia, to Amsterdam, North Holland, Batavian Republic.
Sophia	United Kingdom	The ship was driven ashore at Dragør, Denmark.
St. Peter	United Kingdom	The ship was lost in the Gulf of Finland. She was on a voyage from Saint Petersburg to copenhagen.
Vigilante	Portugal	The ship ran aground on the Goodwin Sands, Kent. She was on a voyage from Riga to Porto, Portugal. She was later refloated and taken in to Ramsgate.

== November ==
=== 2 November ===
List of shipwrecks: 3 November 1802
Ship	State	Description
Diana	United Kingdom	The ship was wrecked on the coast of Norway. Her crew were rescued. She was on a voyage from Saint Petersburg, Russia, to London.
Lydia	United Kingdom	The ship was lost at Long Beach, New Jersey, United States. She was on a voyage from New York, United States, to London.

=== 3 November ===
List of shipwrecks: 3 November 1802
Ship	State	Description
Betsey	United Kingdom	The ship was run down by another vessel in the Kattegat. She was on a voyage from Danzig to Leith, Lothian. Betsey was later towed in to Elsinore, Denmark.
Brothers and Sisters	United Kingdom	The ship ran aground at Eyemouth, Berwickshire, and was wrecked. She was on a voyage from Hamburg to Leith, Lothian. She was refloated.
Columbia	United Kingdom	The ship was destroyed by fire in the North Sea. Her crew survived. She was on a voyage from Hamburg to Málaga, Spain.
Johanna	Sweden	The ship foundered in the Baltic Sea while on a voyage from Stockholm to Dublin, United Kingdom.
Santos Mártires	Portugal	The ship was driven ashore on the coast of Sweden. She was on a voyage from Saint Petersburg, Russia, to Lisbon.

=== 4 November ===
List of shipwrecks: 4 November 1802
Ship	State	Description
Aimable Gertrude	France	The ship was lost in the Tagus.

=== 9 November ===
List of shipwrecks: 9 November 1802
Ship	State	Description
Camel	United Kingdom	The ship departed from Newfoundland for Teignmouth, Devon. No further trace, presumed foundered in the Atlantic Ocean with the loss of all hands.
Commerce	United Kingdom	The ship was wrecked at Saint Kitts. She was on a voyage from Saint Kitts to London.
Diligent	(United Kingdom of Great Britain and Ireland) British North America	The ship ran aground in the Saint Lawrence River. She was on a voyage from Quebec City, Lower Canada, to Newfoundland.
Princess of Wales	United Kingdom	The ship was sunk by ice at Saint Petersburg, Russia. She was refloated in May 1803 and taken in to Kronstadt.
Unnamed	Beylik of Tunis	The warship was wrecked near Vado Ligure, Republic of Genoa. Her 86 crew survived, but were taken prisoner.

=== 12 November ===
List of shipwrecks: 12 November 1802
Ship	State	Description
Ewplus	United Kingdom	The ship was driven ashore and wrecked at Great Yarmouth, Norfolk with the loss of a crew member. She was on a voyage from Arkhangelsk, Russia, to London.
Pearl	United Kingdom	The ship was wrecked on Anholt while on a voyage from Danzig to Hull, Yorkshire. Her crew were rescued.

=== 13 November ===
List of shipwrecks: 13 November 1802
Ship	State	Description
Alexander	United States	The ship was driven ashore in the River Avon at Hotwells, Gloucestershire, United Kingdom, and was severely damaged.

=== 16 November ===
List of shipwrecks: 17 November 1802
Ship	State	Description
Fredericas	Courland Governorate	The ship was wrecked on Öland, Sweden. She was on a voyage from Libava to Amsterdam, North Holland, Batavian Republic.

=== 17 November ===
List of shipwrecks: 17 November 1802
Ship	State	Description
Maria	United Kingdom	The ship foundered in the Irish Sea off Cork with the loss of all hands. She was on a voyage from Limerick to London.
Mary	United Kingdom	The schooner foundered in the Irish Sea off Clonakilty, County Cork, while on a voyage from Limerick to Liverpool, Lancashire.

=== 18 November ===
List of shipwrecks: 18 November 1802
Ship	State	Description
Nautilus	United Kingdom	The ship was driven ashore and wrecked on the coast of China near Macao with the loss of a crew member. Seven of the survivors died before being rescued.

=== 20 November ===
List of shipwrecks: 20 November 1802
Ship	State	Description
Les Deux Soeurs Unies	France	The ship was lost near Falmouth, Cornwall, United Kingdom. She was on a voyage from Senegal to Le Havre, Seine-Inférieure.

=== 21 November ===
List of shipwrecks: 21 November 1802
Ship	State	Description
Beresford	United Kingdom	The ship foundered in the Atlantic Ocean off Chipiona, Spain. She was on a voyage from Waterford to Cádiz, Spain.
Mary	United Kingdom	The ship sank at Dublin while on a voyage from London to Liverpool, Lancashire. Her crew were rescued.

=== 22 November ===
List of shipwrecks: 22 November 1802
Ship	State	Description
Essex	United Kingdom	The ship was wrecked at Bilbao, Spain. Her crew were rescued. She was on a voyage from Portsmouth, Hampshire, to Bilbao.
Lord Seaforth	United Kingdom	The ship was lost near Lisbon, Portugal. She was on a voyage from Montreal, Lower Canada, British North America, to Portsmouth, Hampshire, and a Mediterranean port.

=== 23 November ===
List of shipwrecks: 23 November 1802
Ship	State	Description
Cotsford	United Kingdom	The ship foundered in the North Sea off Harwich, Essex, while on a voyage from London to Hamburg.
Enterprize	United States	The ship was wrecked off Tybee Island, Georgia. She was on a voyage from Trinidad to Savannah, Georgia and Norfolk, Virginia.
Vreede (or Vryheid)	Batavian Republic	The East Indiaman was driven ashore and wrecked between Dymchurch and Hythe, Kent, United Kingdom, with the loss of over 400 lives. There were twelve or eighteen survivors. She was on a voyage from Amsterdam, North Holland to the Cape of Good Hope and Batavia, Dutch East Indies. Survivors were subsequently lost when Duchess of York (United Kingdom) foundered whilst taking them back to the Batavian Republic.

=== 25 November ===
List of shipwrecks: 25 November 1802
Ship	State	Description
Providence	United Kingdom	The sloop was wrecked off Stoke Point, Plymouth, Devon, with the loss of all four crew.

=== 26 November ===
List of shipwrecks: 26 November 1802
Ship	State	Description
Confidence	United States	The ship was lost at the mouth of the Garonne, France.
Friends	United Kingdom	The brig was driven ashore and wrecked at Lisbon, Portugal. Her crew were rescued. She was on a voyage from Cork to Gibraltar.
Kitty	United Kingdom	The ship was in collision with two other vessels and sank at Newcastle-upon-Tyne, Northumberland. She was on a voyage from Leith, Lothian to Newcastle-upon-Tyne.
Three Sisters	United Kingdom	The ship struck the Herd Sand and consequently foundered in the North Sea off Newcastle-upon-Tyne. Her crew were rescued, She was on a voyage from Sunderland, County Durham, to Hamburg.
Vaillant	France	The ship was wrecked on the Île Nonant, off Quimper, Finistère.

=== 27 November ===
List of shipwrecks: 27 November 1802
Ship	State	Description
Carron	United Kingdom	The ship ran aground in the Firth of Tay. She was refloated with assistance.
Michael Christina	Denmark	The ship ran aground in the Firth of Tay and was wrecked with the loss of three of her nine crew.
Vaillant	France	The ship was lost near Penmarc'h, Finistère. Her crew were rescued.

=== 28 November ===
List of shipwrecks: 28 November 1802
Ship	State	Description
Recovery	United Kingdom	The ship struck an anchor and sank at "The Hermitage". She was on a voyage from London to Mogador, Morocco.

=== Unknown date ===
List of shipwrecks: Unknown date in November 1802
Ship	State	Description
Achilles	Sweden	The ship was driven ashore near Chichester, Sussex, United Kingdom. She was on a voyage from Alicante, Spain, to Gothenburg.
Active	United Kingdom	The ship was wrecked on Öland, Sweden. She was on a voyage from Wyburg to Great Yarmouth, Norfolk.
Adriana	Batavian Republic	The ship foundered in the English Channel off Hastings, Sussex, United Kingdom, with the loss of four of her crew. She was on a voyage from Málaga, Spain, to Rotterdam, South Holland.
Alexander	United Kingdom	The ship was driven ashore and wrecked on Stedding Point, Denmark.
Alligator	United Kingdom	The ship was wrecked on Stedding Point while on a voyage from Danzig to Liverpool, Lancashire.
Asphalon	United Kingdom	The ship was driven ashore. She was on a voyage from Memel, Prussia to London. She was refloated and taken in to Harwich, Essex.
Betsey	United Kingdom	The ship ran aground on the Haisborough Sands, in the North Sea off the coast of Norfolk and was abandoned by her crew. She was on a voyage from Saint Petersburg, Russia, to London. Betsey was later refloated and taken in to Great Yarmouth.
Brothers	(Ottoman Empire) Egypt	The brig was driven ashore and wrecked on Saintonge, Charente-Maritime, France, while on a voyage from Havana, Cuba, to Bordeaux, Charente-Maritime.
Commerce	United Kingdom	The ship was wrecked on the Norwegian coast with the loss of a crew member. She was on a voyage from Saint Petersburg to London.
Diana	United Kingdom	The ship was wrecked at Grienslad, Norway. Her crew were rescued.
Edinburgh	United Kingdom	The ship was wrecked near Whitby, Yorkshire.
Expedition	United Kingdom	The ship foundered in the North Sea off Hellevoetsluis, Zeeland, Batavian Republic, while on a voyage from Riga, Russia, to Schiedam, South Holland, Batavian Republic. Her crew were rescued.
Felicity	United Kingdom	The ship was driven ashore and damaged on Gotland, Sweden.
Fielding	United Kingdom	The ship was driven ashore to Gotland. She was on a voyage from Saint Petersburg, Russia to Portsmouth. Hampshire. She was refloated and taken in to port for repairs.
Hillsborough	United Kingdom	The ship was wrecked at Falsterbo, Sweden, while on a voyage from Danzig to Leith, Lothian.
Jane	United Kingdom	The ship was wrecked on Læsø, Denmark. She was on a voyage from London to Saint Petersburg.
Justitia	Trieste	The ship was wrecked at Beerhaven, County Cork, United Kingdom. She was on a voyage from Bergen, Norway, to Trieste.
Liberty	United Kingdom	The ship was driven ashore on the Portuguese coast while on a voyage from King's Lynn, Norfolk, to Porto, Portugal.
Maister	United Kingdom	The ship was driven ashore at Carlshamn, Sweden.
Mary	United Kingdom	The ship was driven ashore on the coast of Norway.
Mary	United Kingdom	The ship was wrecked on the North Bull, Dublin. Her crew were rescued.
Nautilus	United Kingdom	The ship was wrecked in the Ladrones with the loss of 29 of her 48 crew.
Nelly	United Kingdom	The ship was wrecked on the Sandhammer Reef. She was on a voyage from Memel, Prussia, to Whitby.
Ontario	United Kingdom	The ship was lost near Black Harbour, County Dublin, with the loss of all but four of her crew. She was on a voyage from New Orleans, New Spain, to a Dutch port.
Pallas	United Kingdom	The ship was driven ashore at Copenhagen, Denmark, while on a voyage from Saint Petersburg to Naples, Kingdom of Sicily. Her crew were rescued. She was later refloated and taken in to Copenhagen for repairs.
Prince William	United Kingdom	The ship was driven ashore at Memel.
Sally and Betsey	United Kingdom	The brig was driven ashore at "Cape Foge", United States.
Santa Margarida	Portugal	The ship was lost at Lisbon.
Sir Thomas Pasley	United Kingdom	The brig was driven ashore and wrecked at Menorca, Spain, while on a voyage from Newfoundland, British North America to Naples, Kingdom of Sicily.
St Mary's Planter	United Kingdom	The ship was driven ashore at Memel.
Themis	United Kingdom	The ship was driven ashore near Woolwich, Kent. She was on a voyage from London to Grenada. She was refloated and put back to London for repairs.
Thomas and Jane	United Kingdom	The ship sank at Lisbon, Portugal. She was on a voyage from Lisbon to Bristol.
Tinker	United Kingdom	The ship foundered in the North Sea. She was on a voyage from Hamburg to Hull, Yorkshire.
Trial	United Kingdom	The ship was wrecked on the North Bull, Dublin. Her crew were rescued.
Two Sisters	United Kingdom	The ship sank in the River Foyle.
Vriendschap	Batavian Republic	The ship was wrecked on Bornholm, Denmark. She was on a voyage from Saint Petersburg to Amsterdam, North Holland.

== December ==
=== 1 December ===
List of shipwrecks: 1 December 1802
Ship	State	Description
Jean	United Kingdom	The ship was driven ashore on Læsø, Denmark, while on a voyage from London to Saint Petersburg, Russia. Her crew were rescued.

=== 2 December ===
List of shipwrecks: 2 December 1802
Ship	State	Description
Industry	United Kingdom	The ship was driven ashore and wrecked near Dublin. She was on a voyage from Wexford to Dublin. Industry was later refloated.
Ornen	Denmark–Norway	The ship was driven ashore and wrecked at Branscombe Mouth, Devon.
St. Michael	United Kingdom	The ship was driven ashore and wrecked near Dublin. She was on a voyage from Wexford to Dublin. St. Michael was later refloated.

=== 3 December ===
List of shipwrecks: 3 December 1802
Ship	State	Description
Christina & Catharina	Hamburg	The ship was lost near Dover, Kent, United Kingdom. She was on a voyage from Rouen, Seine-Inférieure, France, to Hamburg.
Friendship	United Kingdom	The ship was wrecked at the mouth of the River Tees. Her crew were rescued by the Redcar Lifeboat.
Sarah	United Kingdom	The ship was wrecked at the mouth of the River Tees. Her crew were rescued by the Redcar Lifeboat.

=== 5 December ===
List of shipwrecks: 5 December 1802
Ship	State	Description
Addra	United States	The ship was lost near Ferryland, Newfoundland, British North America. She was on a voyage from Boston, Massachusetts, to Newfoundland.
Emelie	France	The ship was lost whilst on a voyage from Bayonne, Basses-Pyrénées to the West Indies.
Friendship	United Kingdom	The ship was wrecked on the Nash Sands, in the Bristol Channel with the loss of five of her twelve crew.
Simon and Bella	United Kingdom	The ship was wrecked at Madeira, Portugal, with the loss of nineteen of the 27 people on board. She was on a voyage from London to Barbados.

=== 6 December ===
List of shipwrecks: 6 December 1802
Ship	State	Description
Unnamed	flag unknown	The ship was driven ashore on Goeree, Zeeland, Batavian Republic with the loss of at least six lives.

=== 7 December ===
List of shipwrecks: 7 December 1802
Ship	State	Description
Iphigenia	Denmark–Norway	The ship was lost off Guernsey, Channel Islands. She was on a voyage from Genoa to Hamburg.
Santa Antonio	Spain	The ship was lost off Guernsey.

=== 9 December ===
List of shipwrecks: 9 December 1802
Ship	State	Description
Charlotte	United Kingdom	The ship departed from Alicante, Spain, for Belfast, County Antrim. No further trace, presumed foundered with the loss of all hands.
Diligence	United Kingdom	The ship foundered in the North Sea. Her crew were rescued. She was on a voyage from South Shields, County Durham, to London.
Hannah	United Kingdom	During a voyage from Jamaica to London, the slave ship was wrecked on Hogsty Reef in the Bahamas. Her crew survived.

=== 10 December ===
List of shipwrecks: 10 December 1802
Ship	State	Description
Two Marys	United States	The ship was driven ashore near Boulogne, Pas-de-Calais, France. She was on a voyage from New York to Amsterdam.

=== 12 December ===
List of shipwrecks: 12 December 1802
Ship	State	Description
Vrow Adriana	Prussia	The ship foundered off Whitstable, Kent, United Kingdom. She was on a voyage from London, United Kingdom, to Emden.

=== 14 December ===
List of shipwrecks: 14 December 1802
Ship	State	Description
Amsterdam Packet	United Kingdom	The ship was lost on Long Island, New Jersey, United States. She was on a voyage from Lisbon, Portugal, to New York, United States.
Betsey	United Kingdom	The ship departed from King's Lynn, Norfolk for Perth. No further trace, presumed foundered with the loss of all hands.

=== 15 December ===
List of shipwrecks: 15 December 1802
Ship	State	Description
Countess of Sutherland	United Kingdom	The ship was lost at St. Andrews, New Brunswick, British North America. She was on a voyage from New Brunswick to London.

=== 16 December ===
List of shipwrecks: 16 December 1802
Ship	State	Description
Nancy	United Kingdom	The ship was driven ashore and wrecked near Bamburgh Castle, Northumberland.

=== 17 December ===
List of shipwrecks: 17 December 1802
Ship	State	Description
Advice	United Kingdom	The ship was wrecked on the Haisborough Sands, in the North Sea off the coast of Norfolk. All but two of her crew were lost.
Two unnamed vessels	Flags unknown	The brigs ran aground at Leith, Lothian, United Kingdom.

=== 18 December ===
List of shipwrecks: 18 December 1802
Ship	State	Description
Providence	Bremen	The ship was driven ashore at Calais, France, and wrecked. She was on a voyage from Bremen to Lisbon, Portugal.

=== 19 December ===
List of shipwrecks: 19 December 1802
Ship	State	Description
Adventure	United Kingdom	The transport ship was driven ashore at the New Mole, Gibraltar. She was refloated.
Phœnix	Portuguese Navy	The frigate struck the Pearl Rock, Gibraltar and was damaged. It was reported that USS Adams (United States Navy) witnessed her founder.

=== 20 December ===
List of shipwrecks: 20 December 1802
Ship	State	Description
Jeune Frederick	Prussia	The ship was lost at Memissan, Gironde, France.
Unnamed	Flag unknown	The polacca struck rocks and foundered at the New Mole, Gibraltar.

=== 21 December ===
List of shipwrecks: 21 December 1802
Ship	State	Description
Unnamed	United Kingdom	The fishing boat was driven ashore and wrecked near Fisherrow, Lothian with the loss of all five crew.
Unnamed	Flag unknown	The polacca struck rocks and sank at the New Mole, Gibraltar.

=== 22 December ===
List of shipwrecks: 22 December 1802
Ship	State	Description
Sarah	United Kingdom	The ship ran aground on the Home Sand, in the North Sea off Lowestoft, Suffolk. She was on a voyage from Great Yarmouth, Norfolk to Liverpool, Lancashire. She was refloated and put back to Great Yarmouth in a severely leaky condition.

=== 23 December ===
List of shipwrecks: 23 December 1802
Ship	State	Description
Britannia	United Kingdom	The ship was wrecked on Hog John Point while on a voyage from London to Demerara. All on board were lost, including over 200 members of the 32nd West India Regiment.
Quatre Frères	France	The ship was driven ashore near Calais. She was on a voyage from Antwerp, Deux-Nèthes to Bordeaux.

=== 24 December ===
List of shipwrecks: 24 December 1802
Ship	State	Description
Betsey Drummond	United Kingdom	The ship departed from King's Lynn, Norfolk, for Perth, Forfarshire. No further trace, presumed foundered in the North Sea with the loss of all hands.

=== 25 December ===
List of shipwrecks: 25 December 1802
Ship	State	Description
Mary	United Kingdom	The schooner was wrecked in St Ann's Bay, Jamaica.
Peggy	United Kingdom	The ship was wrecked at Dundalk, County Louth. Her crew were rescued.
Speculation	United Kingdom	The ship was lost near Dublin with the loss of all hands. She was on a voyage from Liverpool, Lancashire, to São Miguel Island, Azores.
Union	United States	The ship sprang a leak off Cape Henlopen, Delaware, and was abandoned by her crew. She was on a voyage from Philadelphia, Pennsylvania, to Dublin, United Kingdom.

=== 26 December ===
List of shipwrecks: 26 December 1802
Ship	State	Description
Le Volcan	France	The brig was driven ashore near Shoreham-by-Sea, Sussex, United Kingdom with the loss of three of her crew. She was on a voyage from Dunkirk, Nord to New Orleans, New Spain.

=== 27 December ===
List of shipwrecks: 27 December 1802
Ship	State	Description
Fredrick	United Kingdom	The ship foundered in the North Sea off Walberswick, Suffolk, with the loss of all hands.

=== 28 December ===
List of shipwrecks: 28 December 1802
Ship	State	Description
Diana	Denmark	The ship was driven ashore near Boulogne, France.
James	United Kingdom	The ship was lost near Waterford. Her crew were rescued. She was on a voyage from Liverpool, Lancashire, to Cork and Jamaica.

=== 29 December ===
List of shipwrecks: 29 December 1802
Ship	State	Description
Calais Packet	United Kingdom	The ship was lost off Vigo, Spain. She was on a voyage from St. Ubes, Portugal, to London.
Catharine	United Kingdom	The ship was lost near Strangford, County Antrim, with the loss of two of her crew. She was on a voyage from Wexford to Liverpool, Lancashire.
Commerce	United States	The ship was driven ashore and wrecked near Sandy Hook, New Jersey. She was on a voyage from the Turks Islands to New York.
Edward and Mary	United Kingdom	The brig was driven onto the Wherry Rocks, Mount's Bay, Cornwall, and was wrecked. Her crew were rescued.
Jonge Jan Swaartz	Batavian Republic	The ship was wrecked at Plymouth, Devon, United Kingdom. Her crew were rescued. She was on a voyage from Amsterdam, North Holland to Bayonne, Basses-Pyrénées, France.
Juno	United States	The ship was driven ashore and wrecked in Whitesand Bay, Cornwall, with the loss of one life. She was on a voyage from Philadelphia, Pennsylvania, to London.
Relief	United Kingdom	The sloop was wrecked in Teal's Bay. Her crew were rescued.
Unanimity	United Kingdom	The sloop was driven ashore and wrecked in Whitesand Bay with the loss of all but one of her crew.
Five unnamed vessels	Flags unknown	The ships were driven ashore at Sunderland, County Durham, United Kingdom. Four of them were refloated, the fifth was severely damaged.
Unnamed	Prussia	The galiot was drive ashore and wrecked in Boveysand Bay, Devon.

=== 30 December ===
List of shipwrecks: 30 December 1802
Ship	State	Description
Unnamed	United Kingdom	The pilot boat capsized at Sunderland, County Durham with the loss of one life.
Unnamed vessels	Flags unknown	The ships were wrecked on the coasts of Devon and Cornwall, United Kingdom with much loss of life.

=== 31 December ===
List of shipwrecks: 31 December 1802
Ship	State	Description
El Carmen	Spain	The ship was lost at Cádiz. She was on a voyage from Cumaná, Captaincy General of Venezuela to Cádiz.

=== Unknown date ===
List of shipwrecks: Unknown date in December 1802
Ship	State	Description
Amphion	Sweden	The ship was driven ashore nearPaimbœuf, Loire-Inférieure, France.
Baltimore	United States	The ship was in collision with Northumberland (United Kingdom) off Holyhead, Anglesey, United Kingdom. She put into Holyhead, where she sank. Baltimore was on a voyage from Baltimore, Maryland, to Liverpool, Lancashire, United Kingdom.
Batavia	Bremen	The ship was lost in the Weser. she was on a voyage from Baltimore, Maryland, United States, to Bremen.
Bremerlee	Bremen	The ship was lost whilst on a voyage from Bremen to Hamburg.
Caroline	United Kingdom	The ship was wrecked on the Welsh coast. She was on a voyage from Dublin to London.
Ceres	United Kingdom	The ship ran aground in the Nieuwe Diep. She was refloated.
Cygnet	United Kingdom	The ship was wrecked near Whitby, Yorkshire.
Defiance	United Kingdom	The whaler was driven ashore and wrecked on the French coast with the loss of nine of her 30 crew. She was on a voyage from London to the South Seas.
Duchess of York	United Kingdom	The ship foundered in the English Channel with the loss of all on board. She was on a voyage from Dover, Kent to Vlissingen, Zeeland, Batavian Republic.
Eagle	United Kingdom	The ship sprang a leak and was beached at Great Yarmouth, Norfolk.
Economy	United Kingdom	The ship was wrecked on the Shipwash Sand, in the North Sea off the coast of Suffolk. Her crew were rescued. She was on a voyage from South Shields, County Durham to London.
Edward & Mary	United Kingdom	The ship was lost at Penzance, Cornwall.
Esperanza	United Kingdom	The ship was lost near Westerwick, Sweden. She was on a voyage from Málaga, Spain, to Saint Petersburg, Russia.
Fingal	France	The ship was driven ashore and wrecked near Onega, Russia. She was on a voyage from Onega to Brest, Finistère.
Friends	United Kingdom	The ship was wrecked at Lisbon, Portugal, while on a voyage from Cork to Gibraltar. Her crew were rescued.
Friends	United Kingdom	The ship was wrecked near Newton with the loss of all but one of her crew. She was on a voyage from London to Bristol, Gloucestershire.
Friends Goodwill	United Kingdom	The ship sank in the River Tweed. She was on a voyage from London to Perth.
Galatea	United Kingdom	The ship was wrecked at Sandown, Isle of Wight.
General Hutchinson	United Kingdom	The sloop foundered off Galway. She was on a voyage from Cork to Galway.
George	United Kingdom	The ship was wrecked in The Swin, North Sea.
Grenville	United Kingdom	The ship was lost near Bridlington, Yorkshire. Her crew were rescued.
Haerlems Welfare	Batavian Republic	The ship lost her rudder in the North Sea. She put into Whitby, where she sank. Haerlems Welfare was on a voyage from Rotterdam, South Holland to Stockton-on-Tees, County Durham.
Hazard	United Kingdom	The ship was lost near La Rochelle, Loire-Inférieure, France. She was on a voyage from Barnstaple, Devon, to Bordeaux, Gironde, France.
Hercules	Prussia	The ship was wrecked on the coast of Jutland, Denmark, while on a voyage from Memel to Leer. Her crew were rescued.
Hibernia	United Kingdom	The ship was driven ashore at Ballywater, County Antrim. She was later refloated.
Hope	United Kingdom	The ship was wrecked on the Fair Ness Rock, off Margate, Kent, while on a voyage from Rouen, Seine-Inférieure to London.
Hoop van Hoe	Batavian Republic	The ship sprang a leak and was abandoned in the North Sea 10 nautical miles (19 km) off Texel, North Holland. Her crew were rescued. She was on a voyage from London to Amsterdam, North Holland.
Ingebord	Flag unknown	The yacht was wrecked at Altenkirchen, Duchy of Mecklenberg-Schwerin with the loss of all five crew.
Jean and Agnes	United States	The ship was wrecked on the Irish coast. She was on a voyage from Charleston, South Carolina, United States, to Liverpool.
Kitty	United Kingdom	The ship sank at South Shields.
Levant	United Kingdom	The ship was lost at Venice. Her crew were rescued. She was on a voyage from Liverpool to Venice.
Lively	United Kingdom	The ship was lost whilst on a voyage from London to Harlingen, Friesland, Batavian Republic.
Mary	United Kingdom	The ship was wrecked on Texel.
Mercury	United Kingdom	The ship was wrecked off Lowestoft, Suffolk. Her crew were rescued. She was on a voyage from Leith, Lothian, to London.
Mermaid	United Kingdom	The ship was lost near Texel.
Mona	United Kingdom	The ship foundered in the Irish Sea off Bunmahon, County Louth. Her crew were rescued. She was on a voyage from Jamaica to Liverpool.
Nancy	United Kingdom	The ship was wrecked on the Irish coast. She was on a voyage from Liverpool to Rotterdam, South Holland, Batavian Republic.
Nelly	United Kingdom	The ship was driven ashore at Liverpool. She was on a voyage from Liverpool to Rotterdam.
Nonsuch	British East India Company	The East Indiaman was damaged in an accident at Sulkea, India. She was consequently broken up..
Ocean	United Kingdom	The ship was wrecked on the Dutch coast. Her crew were rescued. She was on a voyage from a Baltic port to Margate.
Paulina	Hamburg	The ship was driven ashore near Boulogne, Pas-de-Calais, France. She was on a voyage from the Île de France, Mauritius to Hamburg.
Primrose	United Kingdom	The ship was driven ashore on Texel and was wrecked. She was on a voyage from London to Hamburg.
Providence	United Kingdom	The ship foundered in the North Sea off Wells-next-the-Sea, Norfolk.
Retrieve	United Kingdom	The ship was driven ashore on Texel and was wrecked. Her crew were rescued. She was on a voyage from London to Bremen.
Riga Merchant	United Kingdom	The ship foundered in the Baltic Sea off Saaremaa, Russia. She was on a voyage from Riga to London.
Río Nova	Spain	The packet ship was wrecked near Penzance with the loss of three of her crew. She was on a voyage from Valencia to London.
Rolla	United Kingdom	The ship was wrecked on the Goodwin Sands, Kent. She was on a voyage from London to Barcelona, Spain.
Roman Vasselevitch	Russia	The ship was wrecked on Seskar in the Gulf of Finland. She was on a voyage from Saint Petersburg to London.
Sally	United Kingdom	The ship was driven ashore near Parkgate, Cheshire. She was on a voyage from Lisbon, Portugal, to Liverpool. She was refloated on 4 January 1803 and taken in to Liverpool.
Sincerity	United Kingdom	The ship was wrecked on the Fairness Rock, off Margate. She was on a voyage from Dartmouth, Devon, to London
Stonehouse	United Kingdom	The ship was lost in the Humber. She was on a voyage from Plymouth, Devon, to South Shields.
Theone	France	The ship was lost off The Saints. She was on a voyage from Bordeaux to London.
Thomas and Elizabeth	United Kingdom	The ship was wrecked on Scroby Sands, Norfolk. She was on a voyage from London to Newcastle upon Tyne, Northumberland.
Three Friends	United Kingdom	The ship was driven ashore near Ferrol, Spain.. She was on a voyage from Cork to Lisbon.
Times	United Kingdom	The ship foundered in the Bristol Channel of Minehead, Somerset. She was on a voyage from Málaga to Bristol.
Tradesman	United Kingdom	The sloop was driven ashore at Saltfleet, Lincolnshire. She was on a voyage from King's Lynn, Norfolk, to Wakefield, Yorkshire. She was later refloated and taken in to Grimsby, Lincolnshire.
Trojan	United Kingdom	The ship was driven ashore at Deal, Kent, while on a voyage from Newcastle-upon-Tyne, Northumberland to Jamaica.
Two Marys	United States	The ship was lost near Boulogne. She was on a voyage from New York to Amsterdam.
Union	United Kingdom	The ship was driven ashore on Terschelling, Friesland, Batavian Republic. She was on a voyage from London to Emden, Prussia.
Virgo	United Kingdom	The ship was wrecked on the Fair Ness Rock while on a voyage from Bristol to London.
Vrow Susannah	Hamburg	The ship was lost near Katwijk, South Holland. She was on a voyage from Hamburg to Le Havre.
Welcome	United Kingdom	The sloop capsized in the North Sea off Lowestoft with the loss of all but one of her crew.
William	United Kingdom	The ship foundered while on a voyage from Limerick to Plymouth, Devon. Her crew were rescued.
Woodford	United Kingdom	The ship was driven ashore on Vlieland, Friesland. She was on a voyage from Liverpool to Hamburg.
Zeelust	Batavian Republic	The ship was wrecked on the coast of Holland. She was on a voyage from London to Rotterdam.
Unnamed	United Kingdom	The ship was wrecked near Dunraven Castle, Glamorgan with the loss of four of her five crew. She was on a voyage from London to Bristol.

== Unknown date ==
List of shipwrecks: Unknown date in 1802
Ship	State	Description
Adventure	United Kingdom	The ship was lost whilst on a voyage from Curaçao to Demerara.
Adventure	United Kingdom	The schooner was lost at Newfoundland, British North America.
Agnes	United Kingdom	Atlantic slave trade: The ship was wrecked at New Providence, New Jersey, United States. Her slaves were rescued and sold.
Ann	United Kingdom	The ship departed from Liverpool, Lancashire, for Lisbon, Portugal. No further trace, presumed foundered in the Atlantic Ocean with the loss of all hands.
Ariel	United States	The ship was lost whilst on a voyage from Philadelphia, Pennsylvania, to Saint Croix, Virgin Islands.
Astrea	United States	The ship was wrecked at Cape Cod, Massachusetts. She was on a voyage from Boston, Massachusetts, to the West Indies.
Baron Montalbert	United Kingdom	The ship was wrecked off Crooked Island, Bahamas, with the loss of all on board, including over 300 slaves.
Betsey	United Kingdom	The ship foundered in the Gulf of Taranto while on a voyage from London to Venice. Her crew were rescued.
Britannia	United Kingdom	The ship was lost at Antigua.
Brunskill	United Kingdom	The ship foundered in the Atlantic Ocean off Cape Hatteras, North Carolina, United States. She was on a voyage from Whitehaven, Cumberland, to Virginia.
Brutus	United Kingdom	The ship was abandoned in the Atlantic Ocean with the loss of her captain. Survivors were rescued by Richard (United Kingdom). Brutus was on a voyage from Rochester, Kent, to the West Indies.
Careless	United Kingdom	The ship foundered off the coast of Newfoundland. She was on a voyage from Demerara to a British port.
Catherine & Eliza	United Kingdom	The ship was wrecked on The Martyrs, off Havana, Cuba.
Columbia	United Kingdom	The ship foundered in the Mediterranean Sea while on a voyage from Sicily to a British port.
Columbia	United Kingdom	The ship was destroyed by fire while on a voyage from Hamburg to Málaga, Spain. Her crew were rescued.
Diamond	United Kingdom	The brig was wrecked at Menorca, Spain.
Dispatch	United Kingdom	The ship was lost at Martinique. She was on a voyage from Martinique to Quebec, Lower Canada, British North America.
Dorchester	United States	The schooner foundered while on a voyage from Savannah, Georgia, to Nassau, Bahamas. Her crew were rescued.
Dove	United Kingdom	The ship struck a reef and sank off Little Andaman Island. Her crew survived.
Duke of Clarence	United Kingdom	The ship was wrecked in the Gulf of St. Lawrence with the loss of seven of the eleven people on board.
Eagle	United States	The ship was wrecked on the Florida Reef. She was on a voyage from Portland, Maine to the West Indies.
Earl Spencer	United Kingdom	The whaler was wrecked at South Georgia Island in late 1801 or early 1802. Her crew were rescued.
Echo	United Kingdom	The ship was wrecked on the Diamond Rock, Martinique. She was on a voyage from London to Jamaica.
Elizabeth	United Kingdom	The ship foundered while on a voyage from Savannah, Georgia, to Liverpool. Her crew were rescued.
Elouisa	United Kingdom	The ship was wrecked on the African coast with the loss of all but three of her crew.
Escape	United Kingdom	The ship was wrecked at Curaçao while on a voyage from Martinique to Curaçao.
Ezra	United States	The ship was wrecked on Turks Island.
Felicity	United Kingdom	The ship was driven ashore at Essequibo and was declared a total loss. She was on a voyage from Demerara to London.
Fredericus	Sweden	The ship was wrecked on Öland.
Friends	United States	The ship was lost on the American coast. She was on a voyage from Virginia to Falmouth, Cornwall, United Kingdom.
Friends	United States	The ship was wrecked on Plum Tree Point, Jamaica. Her crew were rescued. She was on a voyage from New York to Jamaica.
Gabriel	United Kingdom	The ship foundered in the Red Sea.
General Lincoln	United States	The ship foundered in the Atlantic Ocean while on a voyage from the Cape Verde Islands to Virginia.
Generous Friends	United Kingdom	The East Indiaman was wrecked in the Paracel Islands. Her crew survived.
George Washington	United States	The ship was wrecked near Riga, Russia, while on a voyage from Saint Petersburg, Russia, to Newport, Rhode Island.
Grace	United Kingdom	The ship was wrecked at Little Cape Mount, Africa.
Gute Mutter	Prussia	The ship was wrecked at "Stevensklint".
Haabet	Hamburg	The ship was wrecked at Messina, Kingdom of Sicily, while on a voyage from a Mediterranean port to Hamburg.
Hohinlinden	United Kingdom	The ship was lost at "the Cape". She was on a voyage from Cap-François, Saint-Domingue to Le Havre, Seine-Inférieure.
John	United Kingdom	The ship was driven ashore in the Gulf of Florida while on a voyage from Jamaica to Liverpool.
Jupiter	United States	The ship foundered whilst sailing from Savannah, Georgia, to New York.
Lark	United Kingdom	The whaler was lost whilst on a voyage from Limerick to the North West Fishery. Her crew were rescued.
Liverpool	United Kingdom	The ship capsized off Saint Domingue with the loss of all but one of her crew. She was on a voyage from Saint John, New Brunswick, British North America, to Jamaica.
Lord Donogmore	United Kingdom	The ship foundered off Saint Croix while on a voyage from London to Saint Croix.
Lord Nelson	United Kingdom	The brig was lost at Jamaica.
Lucy	United States	The ship was driven ashore on Salt Horse Beach, United States. She was on a voyage from Nantes, Loire-Inférieure, France, to an American port.
Lucy	United Kingdom	The ship was abandoned in the Atlantic Ocean. Her crew were rescued by Harlequin (United Kingdom). Lucy was on a voyage from Newfoundland to Barbados.
Manette	France	The ship was driven ashore on Martinique.
Mars	United States	The ship foundered in the Atlantic Ocean off Cape Sable, East Florida. She was on a voyage from Salem, Massachusetts, to India.
Mars	United Kingdom	The ship was wrecked on the Hogsty Reef. She was on a voyage from Jamaica to London.
Mary	United States	The ship foundered in the Atlantic Ocean while on a voyage from Boston, Massachusetts, to New York with the loss of all but one of her crew.
Mary	United Kingdom	The ship was lost whilst on a voyage from the Bay of Fundy to Halifax, Nova Scotia, British North America. There were no survivors.
Mary	Batavian Republic	The ship foundered in the Atlantic Ocean off New York. She was on a voyage from Amsterdam to New York.
Mary	(United Kingdom of Great Britain and Ireland) British North America	The ship sank in the St. Lawrence River while on a voyage from Newfoundland to Quebec.
Mary and Betsey	United Kingdom	The ship was lost off Saint Thomas, Virgin Islands.
Mercury	United States	The ship was lost whilst on a voyage from Boston, Massachusetts, to Newfoundland.
Monticello	United States	The ship was driven ashore and wrecked on Morris Island, South Carolina.
Neptune	United Kingdom	The ship was wrecked on the coast of Florida, New Spain, while on a voyage from New Orleans, New Spain, to Greenock, Renfrewshire. Her crew were rescued.
Neptune	United States	The ship foundered off Cape Edward. She was on a voyage from Le Havre to Virginia.
Parras	United Kingdom	The ship was driven ashore on Guana Island, Antigua.
Pomona	United States	The ship was destroyed by fire while on a voyage from Martinique to New Providence, New Jersey. Her crew were rescued.
Predpiiatie Sv. Alexandry	Russian Empire	The vessel was wrecked on Unalaska Island in the Catherine Archipelago and became a total loss.
Providence	France	The ship was lost near Saint-Domingue.
Ranger	United Kingdom	The ship was lost off New Providence, Bahamas, whilst on a voyage from London to New Providence.
Sally	United Kingdom	The ship was driven ashore on Green Island, British North America.
Samuel	United Kingdom	The ship was wrecked on the coast of Norway while on a voyage from Arkhangelsk, Russia, to London. Her crew were rescued.
Sarah	United States	The ship foundered while on a voyage from Russia to Georgetown, South Carolina. Her crew were rescued by Farmer (United Kingdom).
Sophia Carolina	(Denmark) Norway	The ship was wrecked near Naples, Kingdom of Sicily, with the loss of a crew member. She was on a voyage from Bergen to Naples.
Surprize	United Kingdom	The ship was lost whilst on a voyage from Africa to Barbados and Havana. Her crew were rescued.
Susannah	United Kingdom	The ship was wrecked at Martinique.
Terpsichore	United Kingdom	The ship was wrecked on Flatt Island, in the Gulf of Saint Lawrence. She was on a voyage from Quebec to Bristol, Gloucestershire.
Themis	United Kingdom	The ship foundered, six of her crew were rescued.
Three Friends	United States	The ship was wrecked on Little Henneaga Island while on a voyage from New York to Cape Français, Hispaniola.
Tupper	United Kingdom	The ship was lost in Mutton Bay, Quebec. She was on a voyage from Quebec City to Newfoundland.
Turin	United Kingdom	The galley foundered in the Bay of Honduras. Her crew were rescued by Nestor (United Kingdom).
Two Friends	United Kingdom	The ship foundered in the Strait of Messina while on a voyage from Naples, Kingdom of Sicily, to Gallipoli, Ottoman Empire.
Two Friends	United Kingdom	The ship was wrecked on the coast of Saint-Domingue. She was on a voyage from Nassau, Bahamas, to Saint-Domingue.
Unicorn	United Kingdom	The ship was driven ashore south of Sandy Hook, New Jersey, United States. She was on a voyage from Liverpool to New York.
Union	United States	The ship was wrecked on Sable Island, British North America, while on a voyage from Alicante, Spain, to Boston, Massachusetts.
Westmoreland	United Kingdom	The ship was wrecked on the Isle of Pines, Cuba, while on a voyage from Jamaica to London. Her crew were rescued.
William	United Kingdom	The ship was driven ashore on Hare Island, British North America. She was on a voyage from Liverpool to Quebec City.
William Pitt	United Kingdom	The ship was driven ashore and wrecked on Hare Island while on a voyage from Liverpool to Quebec.
Unnamed	India	The doney was driven ashore and wrecked in the Maldive Islands with the loss of at least one life.
Nine unnamed vessels	{Flags unknown	The ships were wrecked in the Saint Lawrence River.
