= SS Richmond P. Hobson =

World War II Liberty ship of the United States

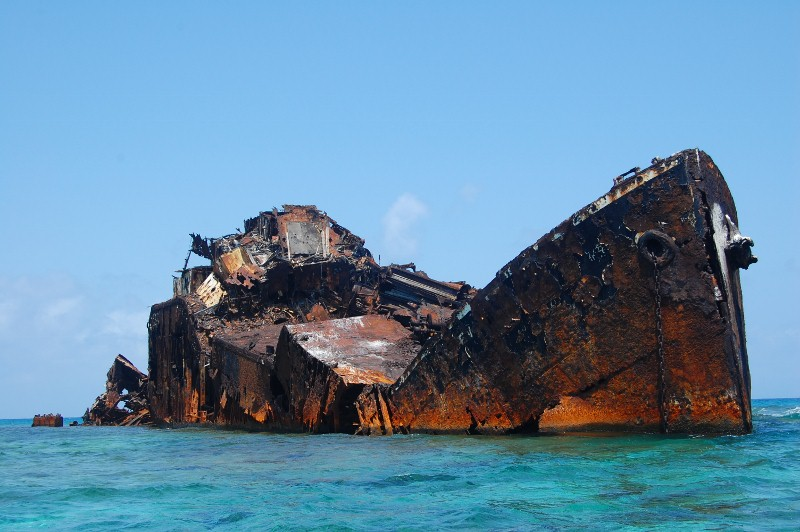
- Shipwreck of the SS Richmond P. Hobson on Hogsty Reef, Southern Bahamas. April 2010

History

United States
- Name: Richmond P. Hobson
- Namesake: Richmond P. Hobson
- Operator: Army Transportation Service
- Builder: North Carolina Shipbuilding Company
- Laid down: 25 June 1943
- Launched: 17 July 1943

Panama
- Name: Nueva Esperanza
- Operator: Cia. Farallon de Nav. SA. (Dow & Symmers, NY)
- Acquired: 1947

United States
- Name: ?
- Operator: Boyd, Weir & Sewell, NY
- Acquired: 1953

United Kingdom
- Name: ?
- Operator: Fafalios Ltd, London
- Acquired: 1954

Yugoslavia
- Name: Trebisnjica
- Operator: Jugoslavenska Slobodna Plovidba, Polce.
- Acquired: 1961
- Fate: Shipwrecked July 1963, Hogsty Reef, Bahamas

General characteristics
- Class & type: Liberty ship; type EC2-S-C1, standard
- Tonnage: 10,865 LT DWT; 7,176 GRT
- Displacement: 3,380 long tons (3,434 t) (light); 14,245 long tons (14,474 t) (max)
- Length: 441 feet 6 inches (135 m) oa; 416 feet (127 m) pp; 427 feet (130 m) lwl
- Beam: 57 feet (17 m)
- Draft: 27 ft 9.25 in (8.4646 m)
- Installed power: 2 × Oil fired 450 °F (232 °C) boilers, operating at 220 psi (1,500 kPa); 2,500 hp (1,900 kW)
- Propulsion: 1 × triple-expansion steam engine, (manufactured by General Machinery Corp., Hamilton, Ohio); 1 × screw propeller
- Speed: 11.5 knots (21.3 km/h; 13.2 mph)
- Capacity: 562,608 cubic feet (15,931 m^{3}) (grain); 499,573 cubic feet (14,146 m^{3}) (bale)
- Complement: 38–62 USMM; 21–40 USNAG
- Armament: Varied by ship; Bow-mounted 3-inch (76 mm)/50-caliber gun; Stern-mounted 4-inch (102 mm)/50-caliber gun; 2–8 × single 20-millimeter (0.79 in) Oerlikon anti-aircraft (AA) cannons and/or, 2–8 × 37-millimeter (1.46 in) M1 AA guns

SS Richmond P. Hobson (Hull # 1994) was an American World War II Liberty ship built by North Carolina Shipbuilding Company, Wilmington, North Carolina. She was operated by Isbrandtsen Line as a limited troopship Carrier starting in 1943 under charter with the Maritime Commission and War Shipping Administration.

== History ==
After the war in 1947 she was sold to Cia.Faralon de Nav. a Panamanian flag and renamed Nueva Esperanza. In 1953 she was sold to Boyd, Weir & Sewell of New York. In 1954 she was sold to Fafalios Ltd of London. In 1961 she was sold to Jugoslavenska Slobodna Plovidba, Polce. a Yugoslav flag and renamed Trebisnjica. She was shipwrecked July 17, 1963 on Hogsty Reef, Southern Bahamas. She was declared a total Loss.
