= Hogsty Reef =

Uninhabited coral atoll in the Bahamas

Hogsty Reef, Bahamas
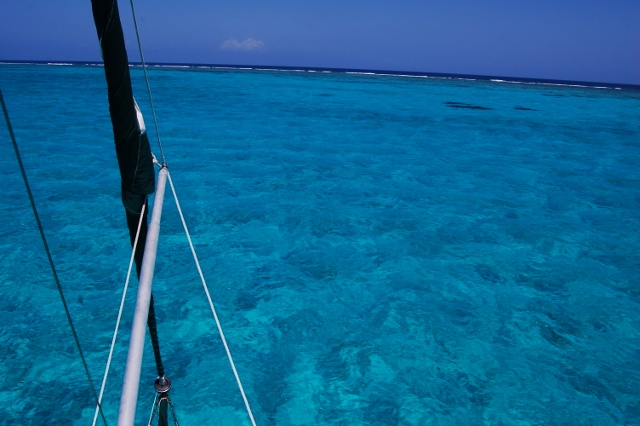
- At the head of the lagoon, Hogsty Reef (Eastern end)

- Location within Bahamas
- Coordinates: 21°41′N 73°49′W
- Hogsty Reef Lighthouse
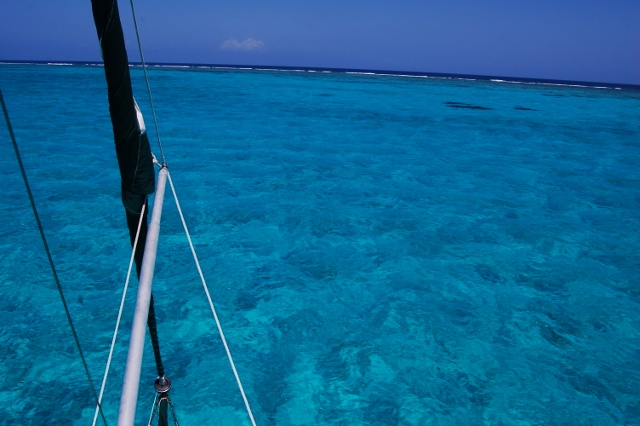
- Construction: stone tower (first) metal mast (current)
- Height: 4 metres (13 ft) (first); 7 metres (23 ft) (current)
- Shape: conical truncated tower (first) mast light (current)
- Markings: red tower (first)
- Power source: solar power
- Focal height: 9 metres (30 ft) (current)
- Range: 8 nautical miles (15 km; 9.2 mi)
- Characteristic: Fl W 4s.

Hogsty Reef is an uninhabited coral atoll located in the southern Bahamas. It is located approximately halfway between Great Inagua (to the South) and Acklins Island (to the North).

== Geography and navigation ==
It is a 8×5 km (5×3 mile) coral atoll rising up from 1,800 m (6,000 ft) deep surrounding waters. Hogsty is uninhabited and hardly anyone ever visits. There are just two tiny islands – hardly larger than sandbars – not enough to offer any real lee anchorage. The islands are small enough to walk/circumnavigate in 5–10 minutes. They do offer good shelling. Most charts and guides call out an anchorage in the lee of NW Cay. It is also possible to anchor at the head of the lagoon. The lagoon is mostly 6–9 m (20–30 ft) deep with scattered coral heads. Good light is needed to navigate it. Once at the head of the lagoon, there is a large field of 3 m (10 ft) sand to anchor in. The charts indicate areas of the reef dry at low water, which suggests good protection from surge at low tide, but as of 2009, little of the reef actually dries.

== Shipwrecks ==
There are two shipwrecks on the reef.

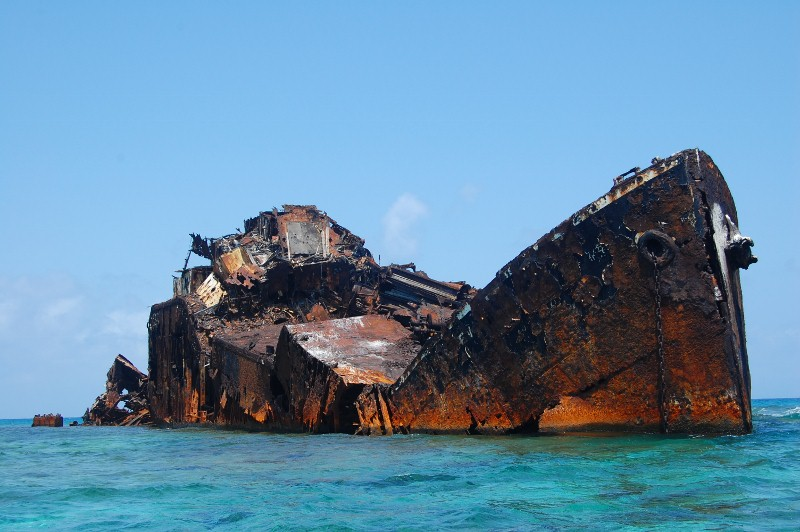
Wreck of the Trebišnjica (ex SS Richmond P. Hobson)

One is a Liberty ship named Trebišnjica (ex SS Richmond P. Hobson), wrecked on the northern part of the reef 17 July 1963. As of 2009, this Liberty ship is well on its way to being reduced to dust. The superstructure is caving in and the hull is broken.

The second shipwreck is on the southern part of the reef. It is much smaller than the Liberty ship – and looks like a small inter-island freight boat – around 120 feet long. The wreck appears to be much more recent and is in much better condition. The name is still plainly visible: Lady Eagle.

The slave ship Hannah, wrecked on Hogsty Reef on 9 December 1802 while returning to London after having delivered slaves from West Africa to Jamaica. The crew were saved, as was a great part of her cargo.

== See also ==
- The Bahamas
- List of lighthouses in the Bahamas
