= Sisters Island (Tasmania) =

Island in Tasmania, Australia

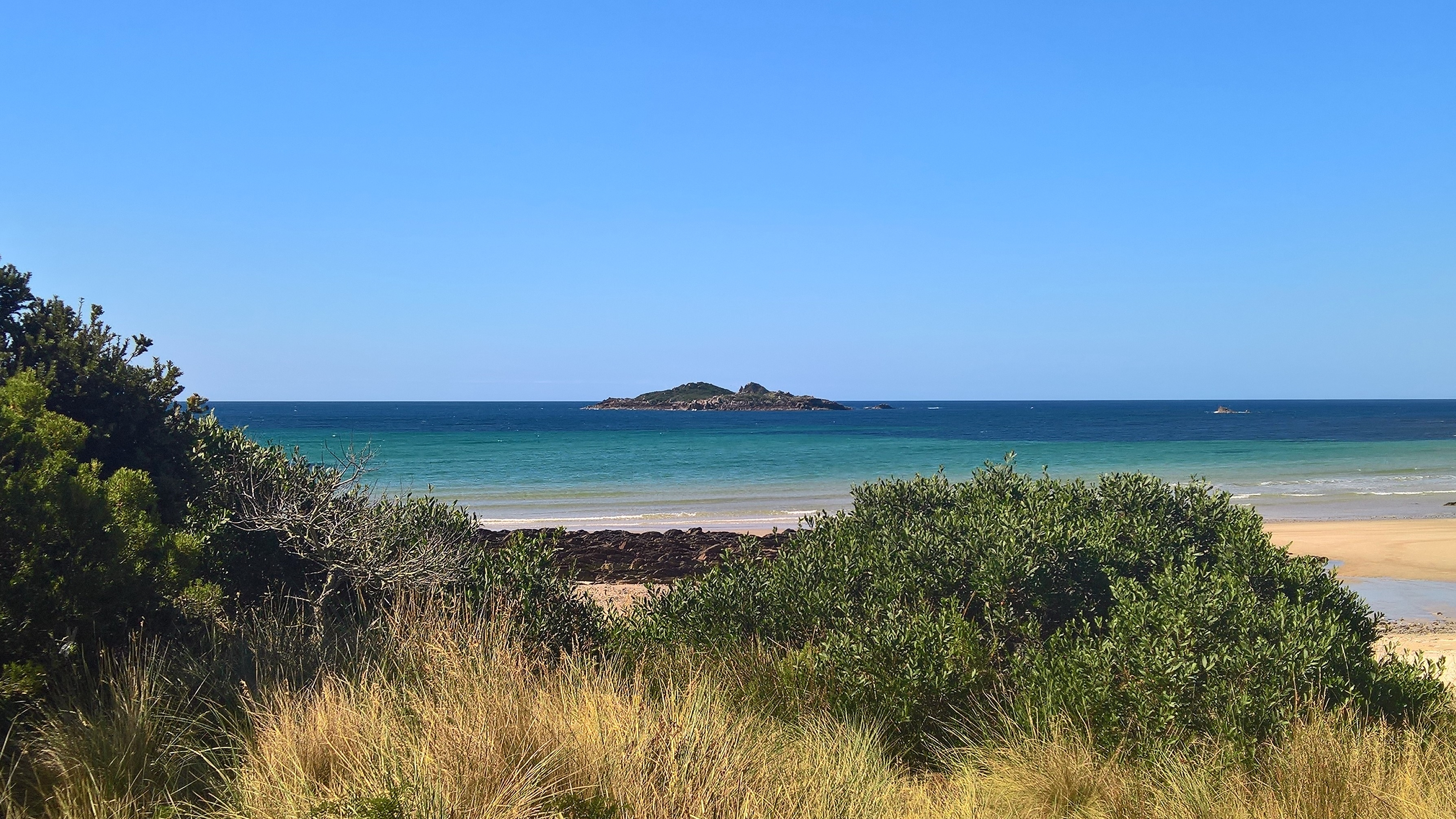
- Sisters Island taken from near Rocky Cape

- Location within Tasmania

Geography
- Location: Tasmania, Australia
- Coordinates: 40°54′14″S 145°34′44″E
- Adjacent to: Bass Strait
- Major islands: Tasmania
- Area: 0.0143 km^{2} (0.0055 sq mi)

Administration
- Australia

Sisters Island is a small island with an area of 1.43 hectares (3.5 acres), off Sisters Beach on the northwest coast of Tasmania, south-eastern Australia. The island is locally known as 'Snook Island' due to the large schools of Snook that local fishermen frequently come across close to the perimeter of the island.

== Features ==
Much of the island is covered with a dense canopy of Coprosma repens. Recorded breeding seabird and wader species include little penguin, short-tailed shearwater, Pacific gull and sooty oystercatcher.

== History ==
=== Ship wrecks ===
L'Enterprise was a French schooner wrecked on the Island in 1802 or 1803.
