= Hannah (1795 ship) =

British slave ship

History

Great Britain
- Name: Hannah
- Launched: 1795, Liverpool
- Fate: Wrecked 9 December 1802

General characteristics
- Tons burthen: 389 (bm)
- Complement: 1796:40; 1797:25; 1798:40
- Armament: 1796:18 × 6-pounder guns; 1797:18 × 4&6-pounder guns; 1798:28 × 4&6 *9-pounder guns

Hannah was built in Liverpool in 1795. She made four voyages as a slave ship in the triangular trade of enslaved people. She was lost in 1801 as she was returning home after having delivered her captives on her fourth voyage.

== Career ==
Hannah first appeared in Lloyd's Register (LR) in 1796 with Livingston, master, Robert Bent, owner, and trade Liverpool–Africa.

1st voyage transporting enslaved people (1796–1797): Captain John Livingston acquired a letter of marque on 1 February 1796. He sailed from Liverpool 23 February. In 1796, 103 vessels sailed from English ports, bound for Africa to acquire and transport enslaved people; 94 of these vessels sailed from Liverpool.

Hannah arrived at Ambriz. She started acquiring captives on 29 April. She delivered the captives she had gathered there to Kingston, Jamaica, where she arrived on 29 November. She had embarked 523 captives and she landed 515, having lost only eight on the voyage. She sailed from Jamaica on 7 February 1797 and arrived back at Liverpool on 26 March.

After the passage of Dolben's Act in 1788, masters received a bonus of £100 for a mortality rate of under 2%; the ship's surgeon received £50. For a mortality rate between two and three per cent, the bonus was halved. There was no bonus if mortality exceeded 3%. Dolben's Act was the first British legislation passed to regulate slave shipping. (Note: At the time the monthly wage for a captain of a slave ship out of Bristol was £5 per month.)

2nd voyage transporting enslaved people (1797–1798): Captain Thomas Given acquired a letter of marque on 4 May 1797. Hannah sailed from Liverpool on 15 June 1797. In 1797, 104 vessels sailed from English ports, bound for Africa to acquire and transport enslaved people; 90 of these vessels sailed from Liverpool.

Captain Given died on 23 November 1797. Hannah acquired captives at "Alecuba", and arrived at Kingston on 31 January 1798. There she landed 535 captives. She sailed from Kingston on 19 February, and arrived back at Liverpool on 9 April. She had left Liverpool with 72 crew members and she suffered nine crew deaths on her voyage. Hannah, Livingston, master, arrived at Gravesend from Jamaica on 9 April.

Dolben's Act also limited the number of enslaved people that British slave ships could transport, based on a ship's tons burthen. At a burthen of 389 tons, the cap would have been 528 captives. It is not clear how rigorously the cap was enforced.

3rd voyage transporting enslaved people (1798–1800): Captain Andrew Arnold acquired a letter of marque on 28 August 1798. Hannah left Liverpool on 29 October 1798. In 1798, 160 vessels sailed from English ports, bound for Africa to acquire and transport enslaved people; 149 of these vessels sailed from Liverpool. This was the largest number of vessels in the 1795–1804 period.

Hannah acquired captives at Malembo, and arrived at Kingston on 22 September 1799. There she disembarked 481 captives. She left Kingston on 30 October 1799 and arrived at Liverpool on 6 April 1800. She had left Liverpool with 51 crew members; 13 crew members died during the voyage.

On her return, Lawson fired a salute, for which he was fined £10 per gun fired. A shot fired by a vessel on 7 October 1798, had killed two men on shore, and badly wounded a third. Thereafter, vessels were forbidden to fire salutes in the river near the town.

4th voyage transporting enslaved people (1800–1801): Captain Arnold sailed from Liverpool on 1 September 1800. In 1800, 133 vessels sailed from English ports, bound for Africa to acquire and transport enslaved people; 120 of these vessels sailed from Liverpool.

Arnold died on 27 December 1800. Captain Andrew Lawson replaced Arnold. Hannah arrived at Kingston, Jamaica, on 30 July 1801, where she landed 338 captives. She had left Liverpool with 51 crew members and suffered 12 crew deaths on her voyage.

== Fate ==
Hannah, Lawson, master, was wrecked on the Hog Sties on 9 December 1801, while returning to London from Jamaica. A great part of her cargo was saved. Lloyd's List also reported that the crew was saved and taken into New Providence, in the Bahamas.

In 1801, 23 British enslaving ships were lost. The source for this datum does not show any vessels being lost on the homeward leg. However, there is nothing in the press reports about Hannah's loss that would have signalled that she was a homeward-bound Guineaman. Still, during the period 1793 to 1807, war, rather than maritime hazards or resistance by the captives, was the greatest cause of vessel losses among British slave vessels.
