= L'Enterprise =

French schooner wrecked in Bass Strait

L'Enterprise was a French schooner wrecked on the Sister Islands in Bass Strait off Tasmania, in 1802 or 1803

Registered in Mauritius, L'Enterprise was a schooner of 90 tons.

== Voyage ==
Her master, Alexander Le Corre, sought permission from Governor King in September 1802 to go sealing in Bass Strait. He was given permission and departed Port Jackson on 4 October 1802. The ship was wrecked either late in 1802 or early in 1803 and Corre and all 12 members of his crew drowned.

== Salvage ==
The schooner Endeavour under Joseph Underwood was sent to salvage L'Enterprise but was unsuccessful. L'Enterprise′s rigging and sails were auctioned in Sydney on 15 March 1803.
