= Vampire (disambiguation) =

A vampire is a being from folklore who subsists by feeding on the life essence of the living.

(The) vampire(s) or vampyre may also refer to:

== Arts and entertainment ==
- Vampire literature, genre
- Vampire lifestyle, a modern alternative lifestyle

=== Fictional entities ===
- Vampire (Buffy the Vampire Slayer), in the fictional world of the TV series
- Vampire (Dungeons & Dragons), in the fantasy role-playing game
- Vampire (Twilight), several characters
- Vampire (Underworld), several characters

=== Literature ===
- The Vampyre, an 1819 short novel by John William Polidori
- The Vampire (play), an 1820 drama by James Planché
- The Vampire (novella), an 1841 Gothic novella by Aleksey Konstantinovich Tolstoy
- Le Vampire, an 1851 drama by Alexandre Dumas and Auguste Maquet
- The Vampire (French: Le Vampire), a 1852 novel Angelo de Sorr
- "Le Vampire", a poem featured in the "Spleen et Idéal" section of the 1857 volume Les Fleurs du mal
- La Vampire, an 1865 book by Paul Féval, père
- The Vampire, a 1891 book by Henry Steel Olcott
- "The Vampire", a 1897 poem by Rudyard Kipling
- The Vampire (Polish: Wampir), a 1911 novel by Władysław Reymont
- Vampire (Ewers novel) (German: Vampir), a 1921 novel by Hanns Heinz Ewers
- The Vampire, a 1935 novel by Sydney Horler
- The Vampires (manga), a 1966 manga by Osamu Tezuka
- The Vampires, a 1971 novel by John Rechy
- Vampires, a 1973 non-fiction book by Nancy Garden, the first book in The Weird and Horrible Library series
- Vampires, a 1991 short story collection edited by Martin H. Greenberg and Jane Yolen
- Vampires (novel), a 1991 novel by John Steakley
- Vampire, a 1991 novel by Richie Tankersley Cusick
- Vampires: The World of the Undead, a 1993 non-fiction book by Jean Marigny
- Vampire: Netherworld, a 1995 novel by Richard Lee Byers
- The Vampires, a 1997 novella by Cameron Rogers and Anthony Short, the 21st installment of the After Dark series
- "The V*mpire", a 2024 short story by PH Lee
- Vampire: The Masquerade (Vault Comics), a monthly horror comic book series based on the tabletop role-playing game of the same name, running since 2020

=== Film ===
- Vampire (2010 film), a horror-thriller drama film starring Jason Carter
- The Vampire (1913 film)
- The Vampire (1915 film), an American silent drama film
- The Vampire (1957 film), a black and white 1957 horror film
- Vampire (1979 film), an American made-for-television horror film
- Vampire (2011 film), a horror-thriller drama by Shunji Iwai
- Les Vampires, a 1915–16 French silent crime serial film
- Vampires (1986 film), or Abandon, a horror film
- Vampires (1998 film), a film adaptation of the novel Vampires
- El vampiro (The Vampire), a 1957 Mexican horror film
- Vampyr, a 1932 German horror film
- Vampyres (film), a 1974 British horror film
- Cuadecuc, vampir, a 1970 Spanish experimental feature film
- Vampir (2021 film), a European arthouse horror film

=== Television ===
==== Episodes ====
- "Vampir", Kiko season 2, episode 4 (2017)
- "Vampire", Aahat season 3, episode 16 (2007)
- "Vampire", Lost Tapes season 2, episode 1 (2009)
- "Vampire" (Patience), 2026
- "Vampire", So Weird season 2, episode 22 (2000)
- "Vampire", Undead Murder Farce episode 2 (2023)
- "Vampire", the alternative title of "A Normal Night", Wellington Paranormal season 1, episode 5 (2018)
- "Vampire", Wildlife on One series 5, episode 4 (1980)
- "Vampires Part I" and "Vampires Part II", Aahat season 4, episodes 51–52 (2010)
- "Vampires", Beyond (Canadian) season 4, episode 5 (2007)
- "Vampires", Is It Real? season 2, episode 10 (2006)
- "Vampires", Play for Today series 9, episode 11 (1979)
- "Vampires", Prisoners of Gravity season 5, episode 19 (1994)
- "Vampires/Cannibals", Most Evil season 3, episode 4 (2008)
- "The Vampire", Dead Mount Death Play episode 15 (2023)
- "The Vampire", Highlander: The Series season 2, episode 16 (1994)
- "The Vampire", Kolchak: The Night Stalker episode 4 (1974)
- "The Vampire", Starsky & Hutch season 2, episode 7 (1976)
- "The Vampire", The Collector (Canadian) season 3, episode 4 (2006)
- "The Vampires", Nate Is Late season 2, episode 18 (2022)

==== Shows ====
- Vampires (TV series), a 2020 French-language supernatural horror television series

=== Gaming ===
- Vampir: Kyūketsuki Densetsu, a Japanese only role-playing game
- Vampire: The Dark Ages, a tabletop role-playing game
- Vampire: The Eternal Struggle, a collectible card game
- Vampire: The Masquerade, a tabletop roleplaying game
- Vampire: The Requiem, a roleplaying game
- Darkstalkers, known as Vampire in Japan, a fighting game series and media franchise
  - Vampire: Darkstalkers Collection, 2005
- The Sims 4: Vampires, a 2017 game pack
- Vampires (Chill), a 1985 supplement for the role-playing game Chill
- Vampyr (video game), 2018

=== Music ===
==== Artists ====
- The Vampires (band), an Australian world-roots jazz group formed in 2005
- Vampiri, a Serbian and Yugoslav rock band formed in 1987

==== Albums ====
- Vampire (EP), by Akina Nakamori, 2017
- Vampire, by 9mm Parabellum Bullet, 2008
- Vampires (soundtrack), from the 1998 film
- Vampyre (album), by Midnight Syndicate, 2008

==== Songs ====
- "Vampire" (Iz*One song), 2019
- "Vampire" (Olivia Rodrigo song), 2023
- "Vampire", by 2 Chainz from So Help Me God!, 2020
- "Vampire", by Dominic Fike from What Could Possibly Go Wrong, 2020
- "The Vampire" (song), by Deco*27, 2021
- "Vampires" (Dukes song), 2009
- "Vampires" (Godsmack song), 2000
- "Vampires", by Bat for Lashes from Lost Girls, 2019
- "Vampires", by Gucci Mane from The Appeal: Georgia's Most Wanted, 2010
- "Vampires", by Pet Shop Boys from Nightlife, 1999

=== Roller coasters ===
- Vampire (roller coaster), at Chessington World of Adventures, England
- Vampire (Walibi Belgium)
- Le Vampire, at La Ronde amusement park in Montreal, Quebec, Canada

=== Visual art ===
- Vampire (Edvard Munch), or Love and Pain, a painting

== People ==
- El Vampiro (Spanish, 'the Vampire'), nickname of Chilean tennis player Nicolás Massú

=== Criminals ===
- François Bertrand, the Vampire of Montparnasse
- Mohammed Bijeh, the Vampire of the Tehran Desert
- Wayne Boden, the Vampire Rapist
- Marcelo Costa de Andrade, the Vampire of Niterói
- Richard Chase, the Vampire of Sacramento
- Tony Costa, the Cape Cod Vampire
- John Brennan Crutchley, the Vampire Rapist
- Staf Van Eyken, the Vampire of Muizen
- Florencio Fernández, the Argentine Vampire
- Albert Fish, the Brooklyn Vampire
- Fritz Haarmann, the Vampire of Hanover
- Joachim Knychała, the Vampire of Bytom
- Peter Kürten, the Vampire of Düsseldorf
- Zdzisław Marchwicki, the Zagłębie Vampire
- Francisco de Marco, the Vampire of Rio Claro
- Enriqueta Martí, the Vampire of the Raval
- Stanisław Modzelewski, the Vampire of Gałkówek
- Leszek Pękalski, the Vampire of Bytów
- Ion Rîmaru, the Vampire of Bucharest
- Marc Sappington, the Kansas City Vampire

== Transportation ==
- de Havilland Vampire, a British jet fighter aircraft
- Flying Machines FM250 Vampire, a Czech light aircraft
- HMAS Vampire, the name of two Australian ships
- HMS Vampire, the name of two British ships
- "Vampire", a variant of Land Rover 101 Forward Control for electronic warfare
- Vampire (car), a jet-propelled car, holder of the British land speed record
- Vickers Vampire, a British single-seat pusher biplane fighter

== Biology ==
- Vampire bat, a bat that feeds on blood
- Vampire fish (disambiguation), several uses
- Vampire ground finch, a bird that occasionally feeds on blood
- Vampire squid, a small deep-sea creature
- Large flying fox, Pteropus vampyrus

== Other uses ==
- Vampire, multiservice tactical brevity code for hostile anti-ship missile
- Vampire (theorem prover), an automated theorem prover for first-order classical logic
- Vehicle-Agnostic Modular Palletized ISR Rocket Equipment, a low cost rocket launcher for countering uncrewed aerial vehicles
- RPG-29 "Vampir", a Russian rocket-propelled grenade launcher
- Zielgerät 1229, code name Vampir, an infra-red device for a German assault rifle
- Vampire number, in number theory
- Vampire power or standby power, the electric power consumed when in standby mode
- Vampire tap, a device for physically connecting a station to a network
- Vampire dugout, a First World War underground shelter in Belgium

== See also ==
- Dhampir, in Balkans folklore
- Psychic vampire, a creature in folklore
- Vampiro (disambiguation)
