= Chrobak =

Chrobak or Chrobok may refer to:

== Chrobak ==
- Eugeniusz Chrobak; (pl)
- Ewa Chrobak; (pl)
- Halina Chrobak; (pl)
- Jan Chrobák, Czech cyclo-cross cyclist; (de)
- Krzysztof Chrobak; (pl)
- Marek Chrobak, full professor at University of California
- Rudolf Chrobak (1843–1910), Austrian gynecologist
- Stanisław Chrobak (1902–?), Polish Olympic skier

== Chrobok ==
- Maksymilian Chrobok; (pl)
- Paweł Chrobok; (pl)

== See also ==
- Chrobakowe
