= Malinowice =

- Village
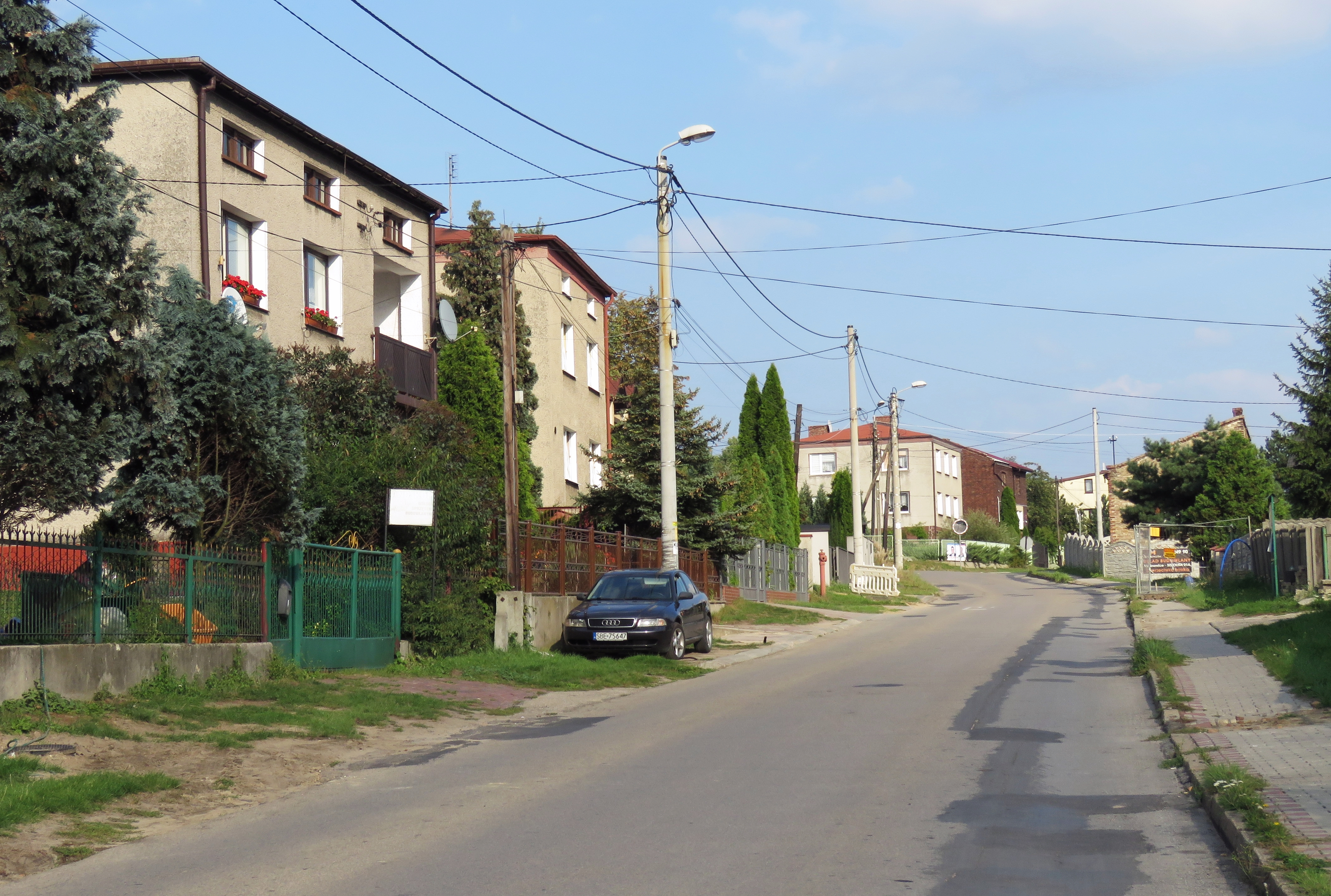

- Location within Poland
- Coordinates: 50°23′24″N 19°8′11″E
- Country: Poland
- Voivodeship: Silesian
- County: Będzin
- Gmina: Psary
- Population: 616

Malinowice [malʲinɔˈvʲit͡sɛ] is a village in the administrative district of Gmina Psary, within Będzin County, Silesian Voivodeship, in southern Poland.
