= Bogdan Arnold =

Polish serial killer

- Arnold reenacting one of his murders
- Born: 17 February 1933; Kalisz, Poland
- Died: 16 December 1968 (aged 35); Katowice, Polish People's Republic
- Status: Executed by hanging
- Motive: Misogyny; Sexual sadism
- Conviction: Murder (4 counts)
- Penalty: Death

Details
- Victims: 4
- Span of crimes: 1966–1967
- Country: Poland
- State: Silesia
- Date apprehended: 8 June 1967

Bogdan Eugeniusz Arnold (17 February 1933 – 16 December 1968) was a Polish serial killer who murdered four women in Katowice from October 1966 to May 1967, hiding their bodies in his apartment. In his testimony, he also admitted to an attempted murder and to torturing his victims.

== Biography ==
Bogdan Arnold was born on 17 February 1933, in Kalisz. He graduated from a vocational school as an electrician. He was married three times, but each time he got divorced, as his wives accused him of aggression and domestic violence. The divorces resulted in his developing alcoholism and misogyny. Arnold lived in Katowice at 14 Dąbrowski Street, where he occupied several rooms in an apartment on the fourth floor. He worked in the Silesian zinc-processing plant.

=== Murders ===
Arnold committed his first murder on 12 October 1966, when he met 30-year-old Maria B. at the "Kujawiak" bar. They talked, after which Arnold bought her a few beers and offered to go to his house, to which the woman agreed. According to Arnold, he initially did not plan to kill his first victim, but when she offered him sex for 500 zlotys, he was enraged since he considered himself attractive enough to get it for free. In a fit of anger, Arnold killed Maria with a hammer and placed the body in the bathroom, having previously covered it with chlorine in order to slow down the process of decomposition.

The next murders occurred in a similar pattern: on 12 March 1967, Arnold lured a 40-year-old prostitute into his apartment, whose identity was never established, after which he strangled her, dismembered the body, and hid the remains in his apartment. The next victim was 35-year-old Stefania M., with whom he met in a bar on 21 April 1967. Later, the woman was strangled and dismembered, and the remains were hidden next to the remains of the previous victim.

The last murder committed was on 22 May 1967, when he stabbed 30-year-old prostitute Helga G. in his apartment. The remains were hidden under his bed.

== Arrest ==
At the end of May 1967, Arnold's neighbours noticed a swarm of flies on the landing and an unpleasant smell coming from Arnold's apartment. Arnold himself did not visit his apartment for several days due to the impossibility of living with four corpses, worrying his neighbours further.

On 1 June 1967, the police were summoned; they opened the front door to Arnold's apartment and found four bodies in varying degrees of decay, as well as a host of cadaverous worms and flies all over the killer's apartment and a persistent smell of decay. Arnold himself disappeared from the crime scene and was hiding for a week from law enforcement agencies who were searching for him. Finally, on 8 June 1967, a police officer, who was on personal business in the area of Granicnaya Street near the Silesian zinc refinery, drew attention to the slovenly appearance and dirt on the clothes of one of the passersby.

Approaching him, the police officer demanded documents, but the man did not have them with him. In addition, he could not clearly explain the reason for being in a public place in an untidy state. The policeman, accepting Arnold as a normal drunkard, was about to release him, but at the last moment, he changed his mind and decided to take him to the police station, where fingerprints revealed the passerby's true identity as Bogdan Arnold. It turned out that he had been hiding all week in an abandoned warehouse near his place of work.

== Trial and execution ==
Arnold immediately confessed to his crimes and began to give evidence. In addition to four murders, he also confessed to an unsuccessful attempt to poison his third wife. He did not repent and strongly regretted that he could not poison her wife, citing her divorce with him as the cause of his misogyny.

On 9 March 1968, Bogdan Arnold was sentenced to death by hanging.

On 16 December 1968, the verdict was carried out.

Arnold was buried in an unmarked grave at number 38 in a special cemetery for executed Polish criminals. The grave was next to the grave of another Polish serial killer, Zdzisław Marchwicki, who had the 39th number. The grave of Bogdan Arnold does not exist anymore.

== See also ==
- List of serial killers by country

== Bibliography ==
- Kryminalistyka.fr.pl profile
- Murdered prostitutes and lived with their corpses - history of serial murderer, Bogdan Arnold 2012-03-08 Gazeta.pl
