= Zdzisław Marchwicki =

Alleged Polish serial killer

- Born: 18 October 1927; Dąbrowa Górnicza, Poland
- Died: 26 April 1977 (aged 49); Katowice, Poland
- Cause of death: Execution by hanging
- Other name: "The Zagłębie Vampire"
- Conviction: Murder (14 counts)
- Penalty: Death

Details
- Victims: 14
- Span of crimes: 1964–1970
- Country: Poland
- Date apprehended: 1972

Zdzisław Marchwicki (18 October 1927 – 26 April 1977), known as The Zagłębie Vampire (Polish: Wampir z Zagłębia), was an alleged Polish serial killer who, together with several accomplices, was convicted of killing 14 women and attacking 7 others around the country from 1964 to 1970. For this, Marchwicki was executed in 1977, but since then his guilt has been questioned.

== Early life ==
Zdzisław Marchwicki was born on 18 October 1927, in a dysfunctional family from Dąbrowa Górnicza. His father had married five times and had four children from his marriages. Later on, all of his siblings would aid Zdzisław in his crimes. Due to his lack of interest in studying and average intelligence, Marchwicki failed to graduate from school.

During World War II, Marchiwcki was sent to forced labour in Prudnik, Upper Silesia. According to his memoir, this is when and where his "perverted tendencies" revealed themselves. After he was caught performing a zoophilic act, he was arrested, beaten by the Gestapo, and sent to the Blechhammer concentration camp. After being released from the camp, he returned to Prudnik.

== Murders ==
From 1964, a series of atrocious crimes took place on the territories of the Dąbrowa Basin and Upper Silesia, continuing (with short interruptions) until 1970. In total, 19 women were attacked, 14 of which were fatal. The Vampire's modus operandi consisted of stalking the chosen victim, running up and hitting them in the back of the head with a blunt object, then beating the victim until she died. In some cases, he had sexually abused the corpses, but never raped them, as no trace of his sperm was found in their bodies. Some of the women were left with exposed genitalia, with one having her pubic mound cut.

On 7 November 1964, the body of 15-year-old Anna Mycek was discovered in Katowice's Dąbrówka Mała district. The autopsy established that she had been killed by blunt force trauma to the head, inflicted with a heavy object, and the offender had hit her several times post-mortem. He then dragged the body about ten meters away, unbuttoned her coat, lifted her skirts and exposed her genitals. Despite an investigation by the MoD, nobody was arrested. In the following months, several attacks on women were recorded: on 20 January 1965, Ewa Pakan was found dead in Czeladź, followed by the murder of Lidia Nowacka in Będzin on 17 March and the non-fatal attack on Irena Szymańska in the same city on 14 May. Due to their similarities, the crimes were connected as serial in nature, and since the killer attacked in the vicinity of the Dąbrowa Basin, which is also known as the Zagłębie Dąbrowskie, he was nicknamed "The Zagłębie Vampire".

However, since Polish operatives had not yet encountered such a vicious criminal, a special summit was held in the second half of July 1965 by the provincial administration of the Ministry of Defence, which combined all the known cases into one investigation. Despite the fact that the authorities remained silent about the murders, rumours about the Vampire quickly spread, sending the local populace and that of nearby Silesia into fear. Female residents from Sosnowiec, Będzin, Dąbrowa Górnicza, Czeladź, Siemianowice Śląskie and even Katowice were afraid to go outside in the evening, prompting their husbands to escort them during the night. Another rumour claimed that the Vampire intended to kill a thousand women to commemorate Poland's millennium. Policewomen were dispatched as 'decoys' in an attempt to apprehend the killer, without any success.

In 1965, a total of 11 attacks were attributed to the Zagłębie Vampire, which further hampered investigators. On 12 November, the body of Jolanta Gierek, the niece of the First Secretary of the Polish's People Republic, Edward Gierek, was fished out of the Przemsza river in Będzin. While Gierek had little interaction with his niece, Jolanta's murder resulted in the apprehension and punishment of the criminal to become top-priority, and the Vampire was labelled public enemy number one.

Following this killing, the murder of a previous victim in July, Maria Gomółka, was examined under a different lens: it was suggested that she had been killed in anti-communist action, as her surname was similar to that of politician Władysław Gomułka, and the fact that she had been killed on 22 July - the date for which the Constitution of the Polish People's Republic was signed and the Polish Committee of National Liberation was established. Another victim, Jadwiga Sąsiek, had two high-ranking militia operatives in her family, and her brother was on duty at the police station in Będzin.

In 1968, the Polish authorities finally appealed to citizens of the voivodeship to provide any information that could lead to the arrest of the Vampire, offering a reward of one million zlotys. As a result, numerous false denunciations were sent to the police, both against neighbours and family members, which preoccupied the police with letters and phone calls. Each of these denunciations was carefully examined, and some even helped solve unrelated crimes.

At a meeting with the head of the Homicide Division of the Ministry of Defence, Col. Jerzy Muniak and Brigadier General Jerzy Gruba proposed a new, hitherto unused method of investigation, which the task force accepted. This consisted of compiling 483 known supposed characteristics of the Vampire, both physical and mental, which were then compared with those of the thousands of male residents of the Dąbrowa Basin. Following this, 267 potential suspects remained, and in fourth place was Zdzisław Marchwicki. For various reasons, the other top three suspects were later eliminated, and more attention was paid to Marchwicki, but authorities could not yet arrest him, as there was no direct evidence of his guilt. On 4 March 1970, renowned philologist and the first teacher of Silesian literature at the Silesian University in Katowice, 46-year-old Jadwiga Kucianka, was brutally murdered. This shocking crime was quickly attributed to the Vampire, but it was also established that in this case, he had not acted alone. A mentally ill craftsman from Sosnowiec, Piotr Olszowy, confessed to being the Vampire when he was interrogated for the crime, but was released due to lack of evidence. Not long after, on the night of 14–15 March, he killed his family and later committed suicide by setting the house on fire while still inside. As his corpse had been charred, no fingerprints could be taken and compared to those left behind by the Vampire on the crime scenes. Just three days prior, the militia had received an anonymous letter stating: "This was the last murder, there will be no more and you will never catch me".

== Arrest, trial and execution ==
In November 1971, the police received a letter from Maria Marchwicki, in which she accused her husband Zdzisław of abusing her and their children, and also claimed that he was the Vampire. Because of this, on 6 January 1972, Marchwicki was arrested in Dąbrowa Górnicza. Three days after his arrest, newspapers published information about the arrest of a suspect in the murders, which was carried out by Brig. Gen. Gruba himself. There are several versions as to what Marchwicki may have said during his arrest: according to technician Wiesław Tomaszek, he said "Have you arrived in two Volgas for the sake of one person? How many of you are here - no more, no less, as the Vampire himself has been grabbed"; in the court files, he is recorded as saying "Well, now, finally, the Vampire has been caught". Almost immediately after his arrest, the task force was split into two groups: those who believed that Marchwicki was guilty (chief among them being Gruba) and those who strongly doubted it (among these were Colonels Zygmunt Kalisz and Stefan Tokarz, Lt. Zbigniew Gątarz and prosecutor Leszek Polański). Marchwicki himself denied responsibility, but behaved oddly at interrogations, talking about supposedly undisclosed murders, and when asked to sign the protocol, he wrote at the bottom that "this is all a lie". At one point, he took the protocol and attempted to swallow it.

Meanwhile, the investigators also arrested his accomplices in the murder of Kucianka: they turned out to be his brothers, Henryk and Jan. Henryk was arrested on 21 May 1972, followed by Jan three days later. The latter, an employee for the administration at the Faculty of Law at the Silesian University, had come into conflict with Kucianka, who had accused him of accepting bribes from applicants and claimed that his sexual orientation sullied the university's reputation. At the same time, while he was a secret informant for the security service, Jan feared that Kucianka would report him to the rector Kazimierz Popelek, so he persuaded Zdzisław to kill her with his help. On 4 July, the investigators also arrested the Marchwickis' sister, Halina Flak, and on 11 November, Jan's lover, Józef Klimczak (who later testified that Jan had indeed participated in the murder) was also arrested. The final arrest occurred on 29 December, when Flak's son, Zdzisław, was also detained.

The investigation into the case lasted over two years, with the case file consisting of 166 volumes. The trial began on 18 September 1974, at the venue Klub Fabryczny Zakłady Zynkowe "Silesia" (Factory Club of Zakłady Zynkowe) in Katowice; due to the notoriety of the proceedings, people were only allowed to enter by purchasing a special ticket. The hearing was chaired by Justice Władysław Ochman and prosecuted by Józef Gurgul and Zenon Kopiński; Marchwicki's attorneys were well-known lawyers Bolesław Andrysiak and Mieczysław Frelich. The main defendant, Zdzisław Marchwicki, was charged with 23 crimes, the most serious of which were 14 murders and 7 attempted murders. The charges seemed sensible to the court, as he had a history of beating his family members, disrespecting police officers, embezzlement of public property and other offences. His brother, Jan, was charged with 8 crimes, the most notable of which was inciting and participating in the murder of Jadwiga Kucianka. Henryk Marchwicki and Józef Klimczak were accused of complicity in Kucianka's murder (Henryk was additionally charged with stealing her clock); Halina Flak was charged with selling stolen property, and her son Zdzisław was accused of not reporting any of the crimes to the authorities.

On 28 July 1975, the court announced the verdicts for all six defendants: Zdzisław and Jan Marchwicki were given the death penalty; Henryk - 25 years; Klimczak - 12 years; Halina and Zdzisław Flak - 4 years.

At 21:00 on 26 April 1977, Zdzisław Marchwicki was hanged in a specially-built police garage in Katowice; his brother Jan was executed in another garage an hour later. Both were buried in graves marked only with numbers in a special cemetery designated for criminals. Zdzisław's grave, at number 39, was next to that of another serial killer, Bogdan Arnold. In 1997, after the abolition of the death penalty in the country, the cemetery was destroyed by decree of the President, Aleksander Kwaśniewski.

=== Aftermath for accomplices ===
- Henryk Marchwicki was remanded to a prison in Rzeszów to serve his 25-year sentence. While he was imprisoned, the militia harassed his family, demanding that his wife divorce him and change her name, or else they would imprison her and put the children in an orphanage. In 1985, they were falsely informed that Henryk had died in prison, but in 1990, the wife found from the media that her husband was still alive. Even when he was still in prison, Henryk began a campaign to clear his and his brothers' names, which he continued following his release in November 1992. In 1998, he died under suspicious circumstances, with the official cause of death being given as him falling down the stairs and breaking his spine, before going back up, going to bed and succumbing to his injuries while in a drunken stupor. The investigation into his death was later discontinued.
- Halina and Zdzisław Flak were both released from prison; the former was granted amnesty, while the latter had his sentence reduced to 32 months and released.
- Józef Klimczak was released in February 1982 due to prison overcrowding, and now lives in a large city in northern Poland (some sources erroneously claimed that he had emigrated to Sweden). He is married and has a child. Police files indicate that the militia blackmailed him into cooperating with the investigation under the pseudonym "Jastrząb", but he gave only one interview and then categorically refused to cooperate further.

== Doubts of guilt ==
There is much confusion about the Zagłębie Vampire's true identity. The 2001–2002 series Paragraf 148 – Kara śmierci had an episode on the case, directed by Maciej Żurawski, which presented Marchwicki as innocent. The episode presents testimony from contemporary militia officers and lawyers, and claims that the whole case was a show trial. In a similar vein, director Maciej Pieprzyca produced the 1998 documentary Jestem mordercą..., in which he proclaimed that Marchwicki was innocent.

In the nineties, information appeared that undermined the fairness of the court. Attention was drawn to the fact that Zdzisław Marchwicki had never pleaded guilty, and that he was identified only by people who thought he corresponded to the perpetrator's suspected profile. The authorities were eager to convict somebody, and since Piotr Olszowy, the only alternative suspect, had committed suicide by self-immolation, it would bring shame on the justice system to not bring the purported killer to trial. The case remains controversial to this day.

== Victims ==
Number	Identity	Date	Place
1	Anna Mycek	7 November 1964	Katowice
2	Ewa Pakan	20 January 1965	Czeladź
3	Lidia Nowacka	17 March 1965	Będzin
4	Irena Szymańska	14 May 1965	Będzin
5	Jadwiga Zygmunt	22 July 1965	Sosnowiec
6	Eleonora Gąsiorowska	26 July 1965	Będzin
7	Zofia Wiśniowska	4 August 1965	Będzin
8	Maria Błaszczyk	15 August 1965	Czeladź
9	Genowefa Łebek	25 August 1965	Będzin
10	Teresa Tosza	25 October 1965	Będzin
11	Alicja Dubiel	28 October 1965	Sławków
12	Irena Szrek	12 December 1965	Czeladź
13	Stanisława Samul	19 February 1966	Gródków
14	Genowefa Bijak	11 May 1966	Będzin
15	Maria Gomółka	15 June 1966	Sosnowiec
16	Julianna Kozierska	15 June 1966	Będzin
17	Jolanta Gierek	11 October 1966	Będzin
18	Zofia Kawka	15 June 1967	Będzin
19	Zofia Garbacz	3 October 1967	Wojkowice
20	Jadwiga Sąsiek	3 October 1968	Sosnowiec
21	Jadwiga Kucianka	4 March 1970	Siemianowice Śląskie

== See also ==
- List of serial killers by country
- List of serial killers by number of victims
