= Goląsza Górna =

- Village
- Location within Poland
- Coordinates: 50°24′58″N 19°7′14″E
- Country: Poland
- Voivodeship: Silesian
- County: Będzin
- Gmina: Psary

Goląsza Górna [ɡɔˈlɔ̃ʂa ˈɡurna] is a village in the administrative district of Gmina Psary, within Będzin County, Silesian Voivodeship, in southern Poland.
