= Psary, Będzin County =

Psary
- Village
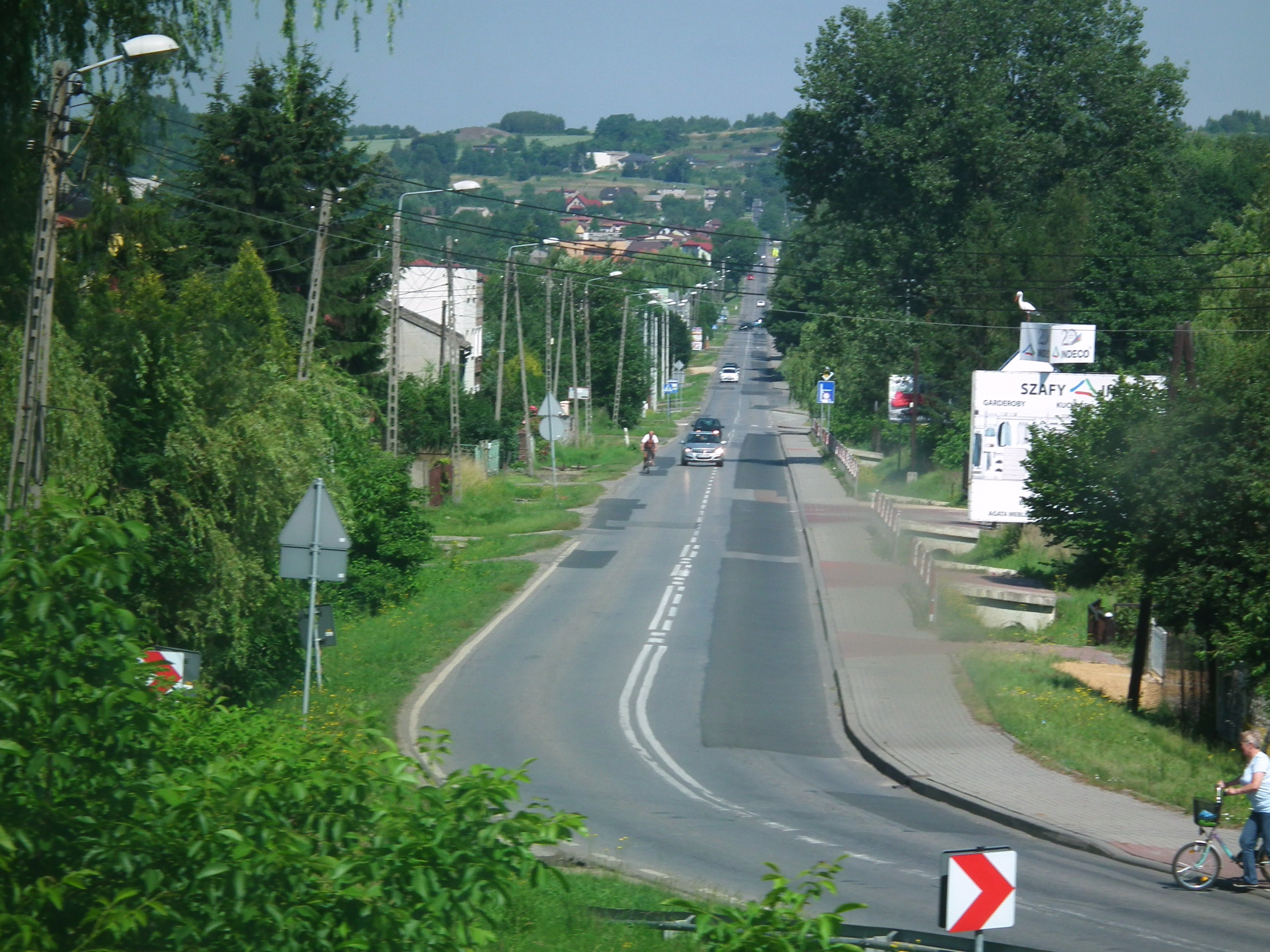

- Location within Poland
- Coordinates: 50°22′47″N 19°6′50″E
- Country: Poland
- Voivodeship: Silesian
- County: Będzin
- Gmina: Psary
- Population: 2,800
- Website: http://psary.pl

Psary [ˈpsarɨ] (Silesian: Psariusz) is a village in Będzin County, Silesian Voivodeship, in southern Poland. It is the seat of the gmina (administrative district) called Gmina Psary.
