= Sarnów, Będzin County =

Sarnów
- Village
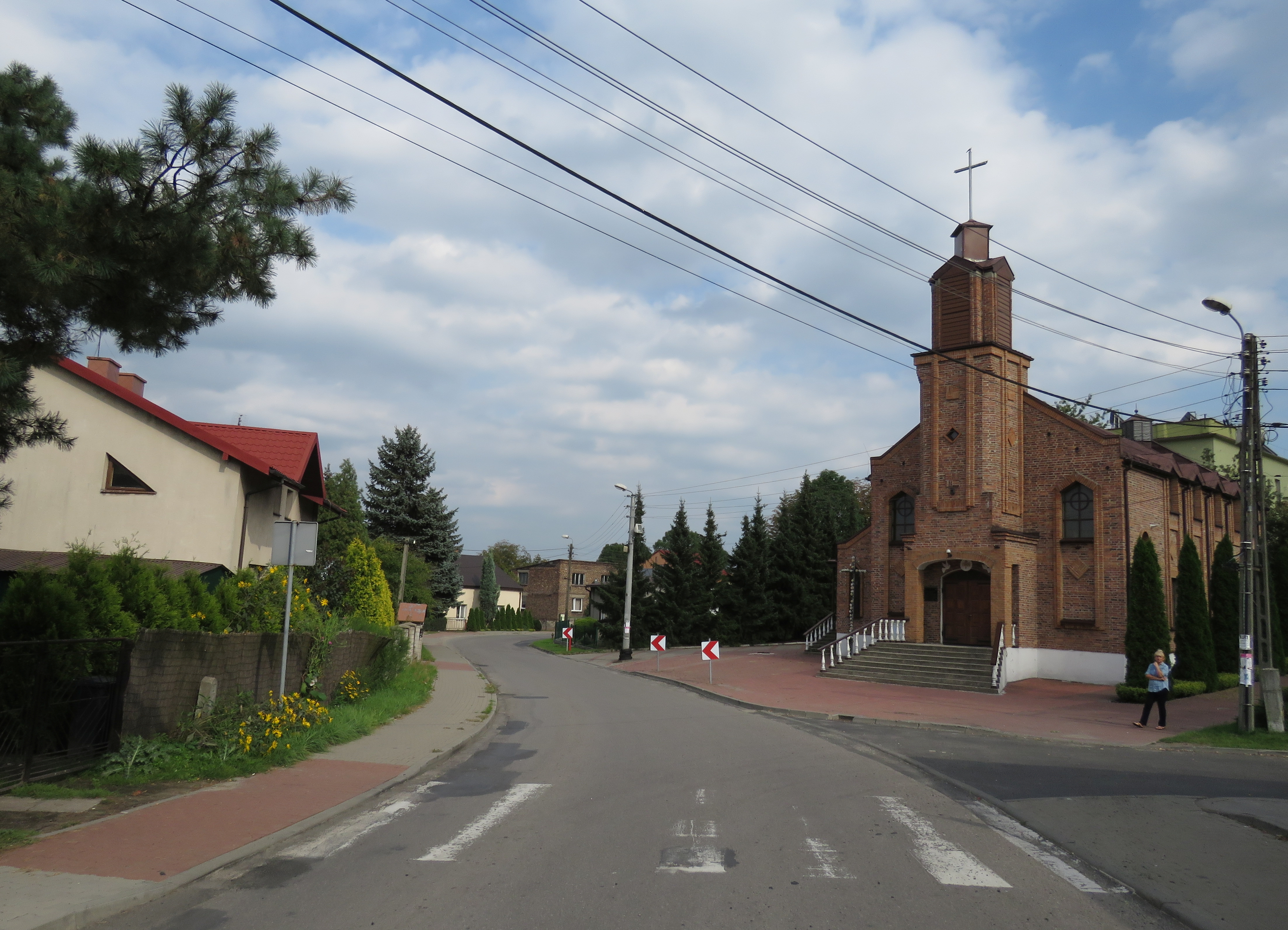

- Location within Poland
- Coordinates: 50°22′26″N 19°9′0″E
- Country: Poland
- Voivodeship: Silesian
- County: Będzin
- Gmina: Psary
- Population: 1,791

Sarnów [ˈsarnuf] is a village in the administrative district of Gmina Psary, within Będzin County, Silesian Voivodeship, in southern Poland.
