= Brzękowice-Wał =

- Village
- Location within Poland
- Coordinates: 50°24′3″N 19°6′41″E
- Country: Poland
- Voivodeship: Silesian
- County: Będzin
- Gmina: Psary

Brzękowice-Wał [bʐɛŋkɔˈvʲit͡sɛ ˈvau̯] is a village in the administrative district of Gmina Psary, within Będzin County, Silesian Voivodeship, in southern Poland.
