= Goląsza Dolna =

- Village
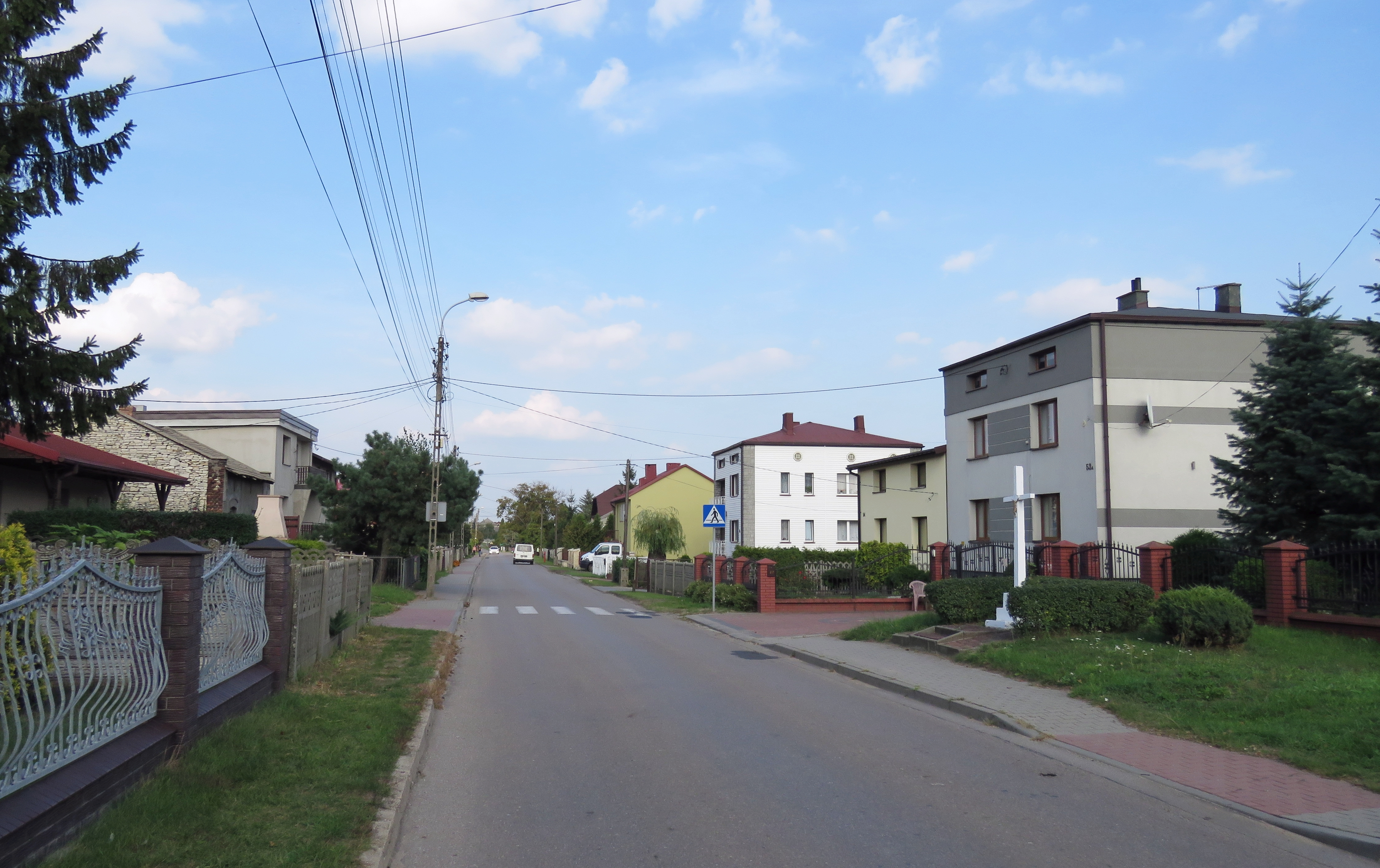

- Location within Poland
- Coordinates: 50°23′55″N 19°7′1″E
- Country: Poland
- Voivodeship: Silesian
- County: Będzin
- Gmina: Psary

Goląsza Dolna [ɡɔˈlɔ̃ʂa ˈdɔlna] is a village in the administrative district of Gmina Psary, within Będzin County, Silesian Voivodeship, in southern Poland.
