= Gmina Psary =

Gmina Psary Psary Commune
- Gmina
- Flag Coat of arms
- Interactive map of Gmina Psary
- Coordinates (Psary): 50°22′47″N 19°6′50″E
- Country: Poland
- Voivodeship: Silesian
- County: Będzin
- Seat: Psary

Area
  - Total: 45.98 km^{2} (17.75 sq mi)

Population (2019-06-30)
  - Total: 12,190
  - Density: 265.1/km^{2} (686.6/sq mi)
- Website: http://www.psary.pl/

Gmina Psary is a rural gmina (administrative district) in Będzin County, Silesian Voivodeship, in southern Poland. Its seat is the village of Psary, which lies approximately 6 kilometres (4 mi) north of Będzin and 17 km (11 mi) north-east of the regional capital Katowice.

The gmina covers an area of 45.98 square kilometres (17.8 sq mi), and as of 2019 its total population is 12,190.

== Villages ==
Gmina Psary contains the villages and settlements of Brzękowice Górne, Brzękowice-Wał, Chrobakowe, Dąbie, Goląsza Dolna, Goląsza Górna, Góra Siewierska, Gródków, Malinowice, Preczów, Psary, Sarnów and Strzyżowice.

== Neighbouring gminas ==
Gmina Psary is bordered by the towns of Będzin, Dąbrowa Górnicza and Wojkowice, and by the gminas of Bobrowniki and Mierzęcice.
