= Wildlife on One =

British natural history television programme

- Graphic for season 21
- Genre: Nature documentary
- Narrated by: David Attenborough
- Country of origin: United Kingdom
- Original language: English
- No. of series: 33
- No. of episodes: 253 (list of episodes)

Production
- Running time: 30 minutes
- Production company: BBC Natural History Unit

Original release
- Network: BBC One
- Release: 6 January 1977 – 17 February 2005

Wildlife on One is a documentary television series which was one of the BBC's flagship natural history programmes for nearly three decades. First broadcast in January 1977, each edition ran for half an hour. The narrator was Sir David Attenborough. When repeated on BBC2, the programmes were retitled Wildlife on Two. The series came to an end in 2005.

== Episodes ==
Series	Episodes	Originally released	
Series	Episodes	First released	Last released
1	8	6 January 1977	24 February 1977
2	4	19 July 1977	9 August 1977
3	6	6 April 1978	11 May 1978
4	6	31 May 1979	12 July 1979
5	6	17 January 1980	21 February 1980
6	6	2 September 1980	7 October 1980
7	8	9 January 1981	10 June 1981
8	5	8 September 1981	6 October 1981
9	6	7 January 1982	11 February 1982
10	5	9 September 1982	14 October 1982
11	5	13 January 1983	17 February 1983
12	5	10 November 1983	15 December 1983
13	5	8 January 1985	5 February 1985
14	5	4 September 1985	2 October 1985
15	9	26 January 1987	13 April 1987
16	10	12 January 1988	29 March 1988
17	9	27 February 1989	22 May 1989
18	10	7 January 1991	25 March 1991
19	10	6 January 1992	23 March 1992
20	10	7 January 1993	12 April 1993
21	10	6 January 1994	8 April 1994
22	13	6 April 1995	6 July 1995
23	13	28 March 1996	18 July 1996
24	5	13 February 1997	13 March 1997
25	5	22 July 1997	19 August 1997
26	9	10 March 1998	20 September 1998
27	6	18 April 1999	23 May 1999
28	4	23 August 1999	30 September 1999
29	9	6 August 2000	9 October 2000
30	11	16 April 2001	1 July 2001
31	10	24 February 2002	23 July 2002
32	10	30 March 2003	6 August 2003
33	10	1 November 2004	17 February 2005
