= Strzyżowice, Silesian Voivodeship =

Strzyżowice
- Village
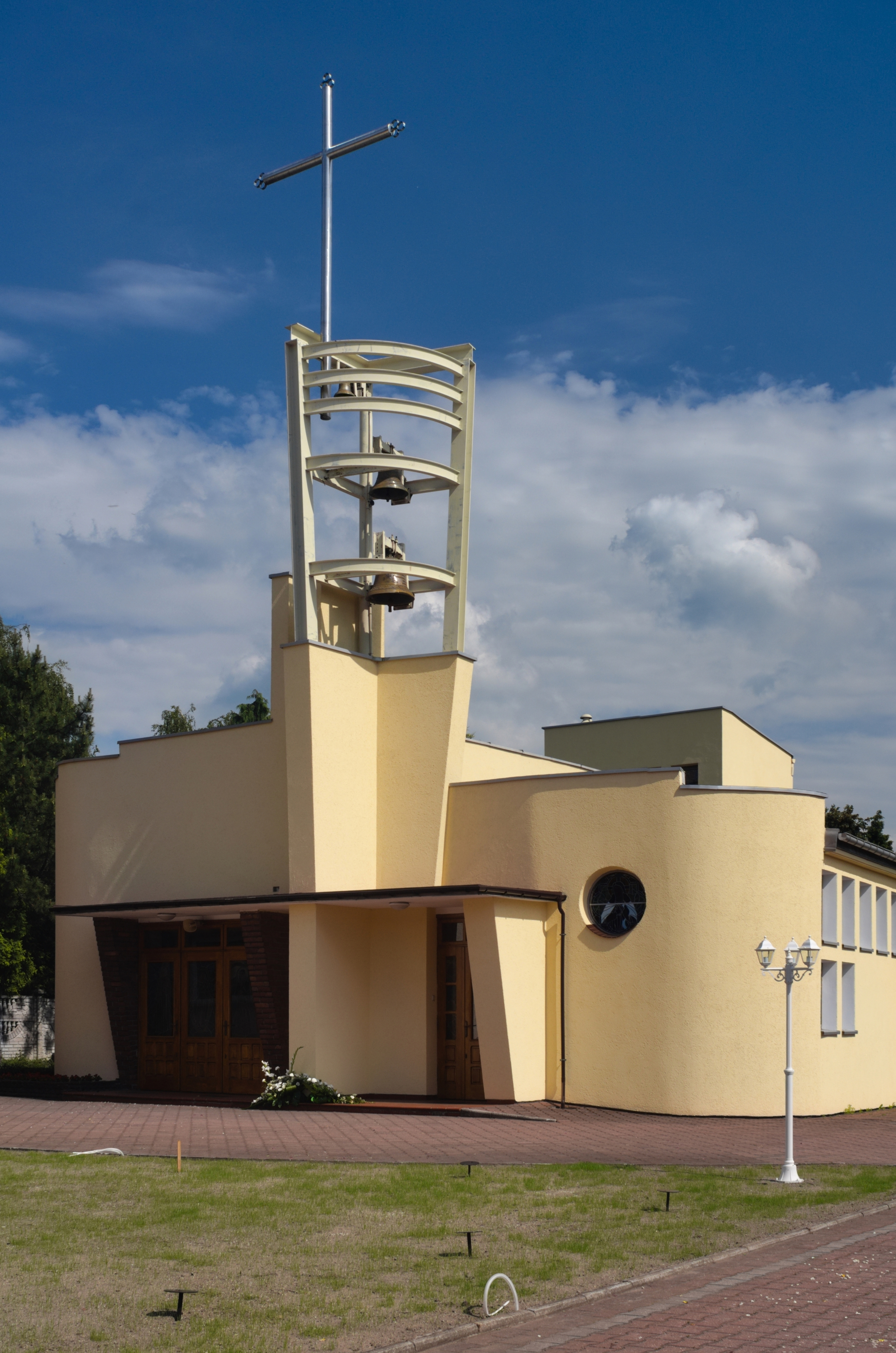
- Catholic church

- Location within Poland
- Coordinates: 50°23′14″N 19°4′50″E
- Country: Poland
- Voivodeship: Silesian
- County: Będzin
- Gmina: Psary
- Population: 1,700
- Website: http://www.strzyzowice.pl

Strzyżowice [stʂɨʐɔˈvʲit͡sɛ] is a village in the administrative district of Gmina Psary, within Będzin County, Silesian Voivodeship, in southern Poland.
