= Dąbie, Silesian Voivodeship =

Dąbie
- Village
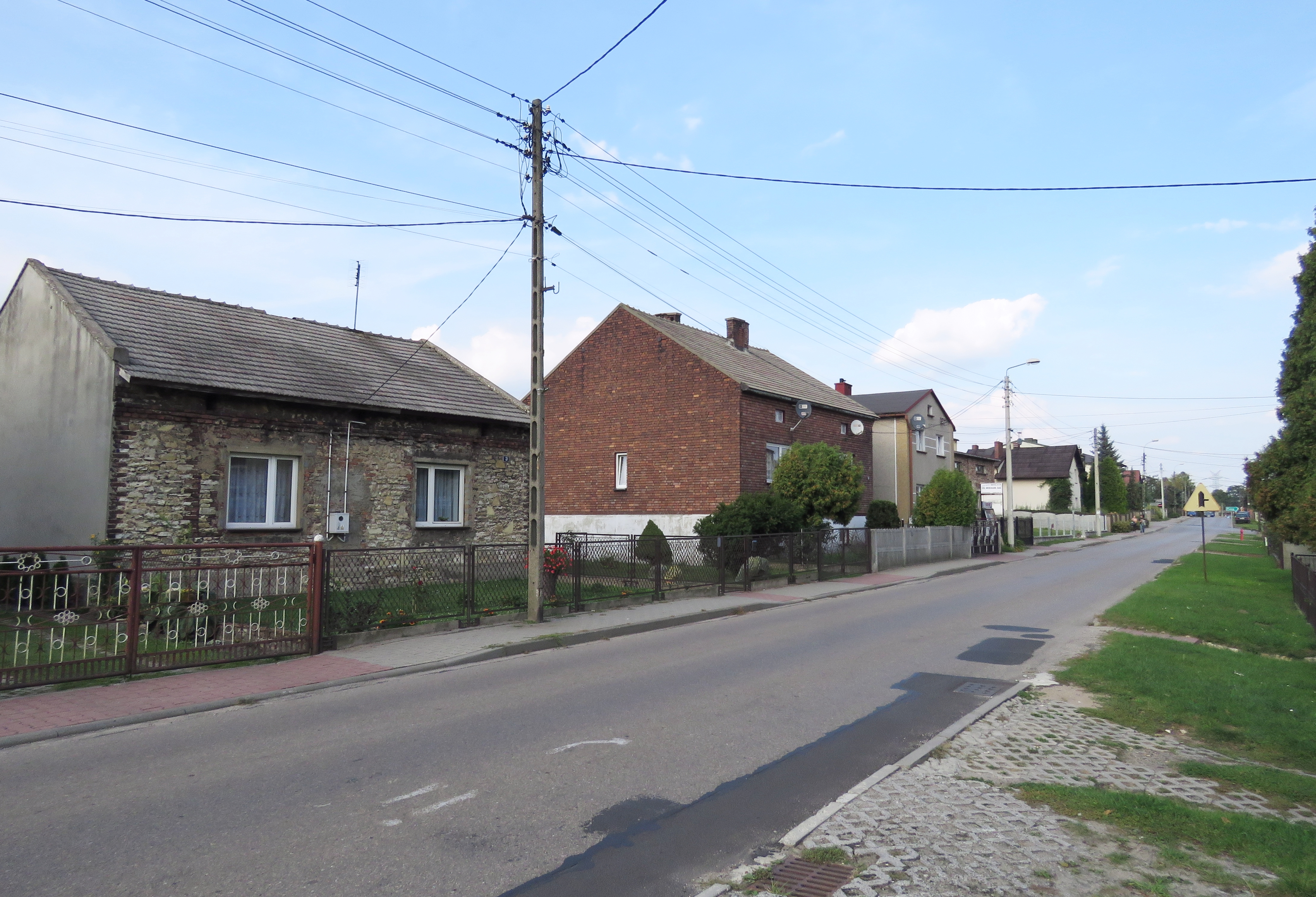

- Location within Poland
- Coordinates: 50°24′14″N 19°8′35″E
- Country: Poland
- Voivodeship: Silesian
- County: Będzin
- Gmina: Psary
- Population: 524

Dąbie [ˈdɔmbʲɛ] is a village in the administrative district of Gmina Psary, within Będzin County, Silesian Voivodeship, in southern Poland.
