= Góra Siewierska =

- Village
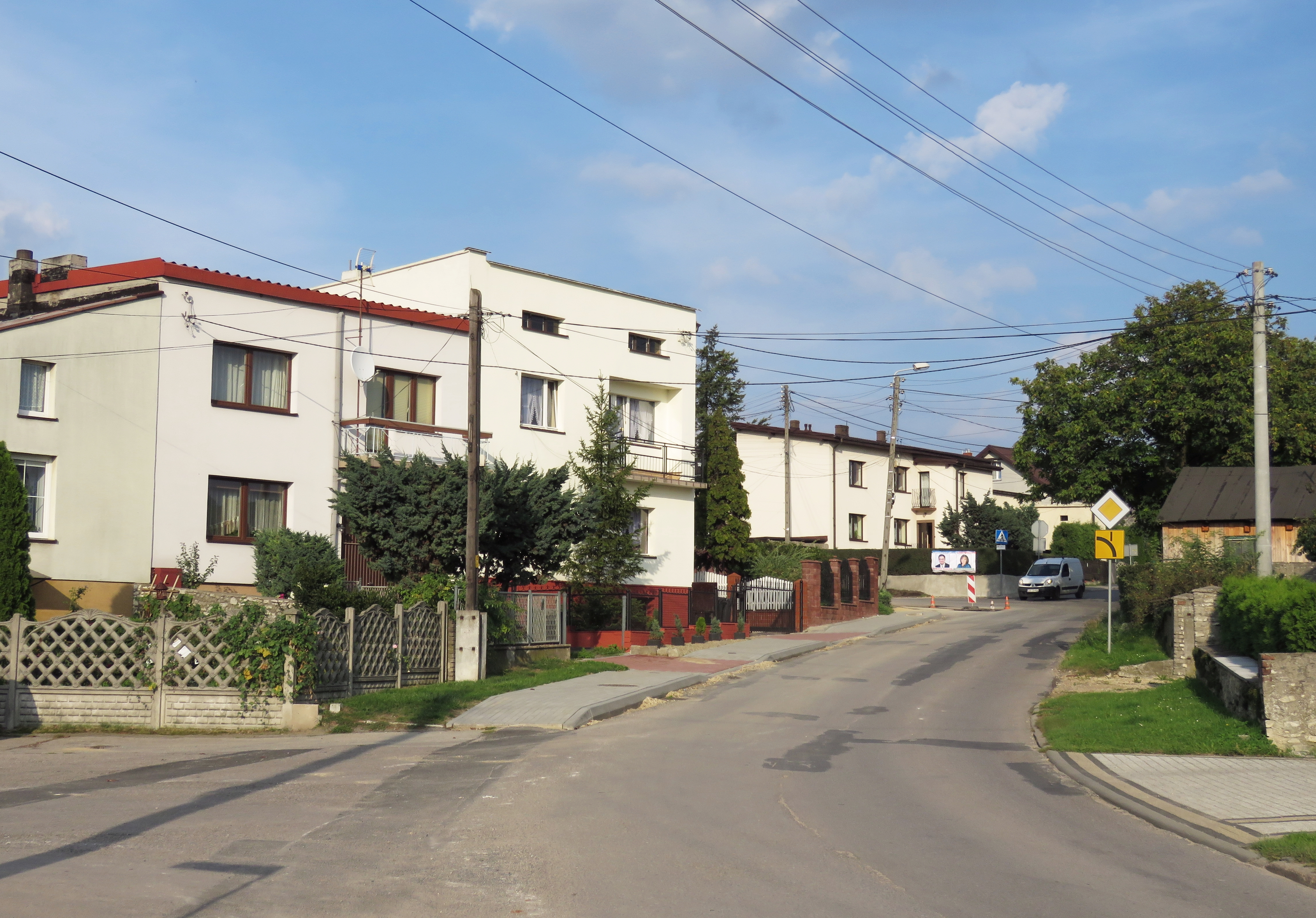

- Location within Poland
- Coordinates: 50°24′5″N 19°4′56″E
- Country: Poland
- Voivodeship: Silesian
- County: Będzin
- Gmina: Psary
- Population: 770
- Website: http://www.gorasiewierska.pl

Góra Siewierska [ˈɡura ɕɛˈvʲɛrska] is a village in the administrative district of Gmina Psary, within Będzin County, Silesian Voivodeship, in southern Poland.

In 1975–1998, the village administratively belonged to the Katowice province.
