= Preczów =

- Village
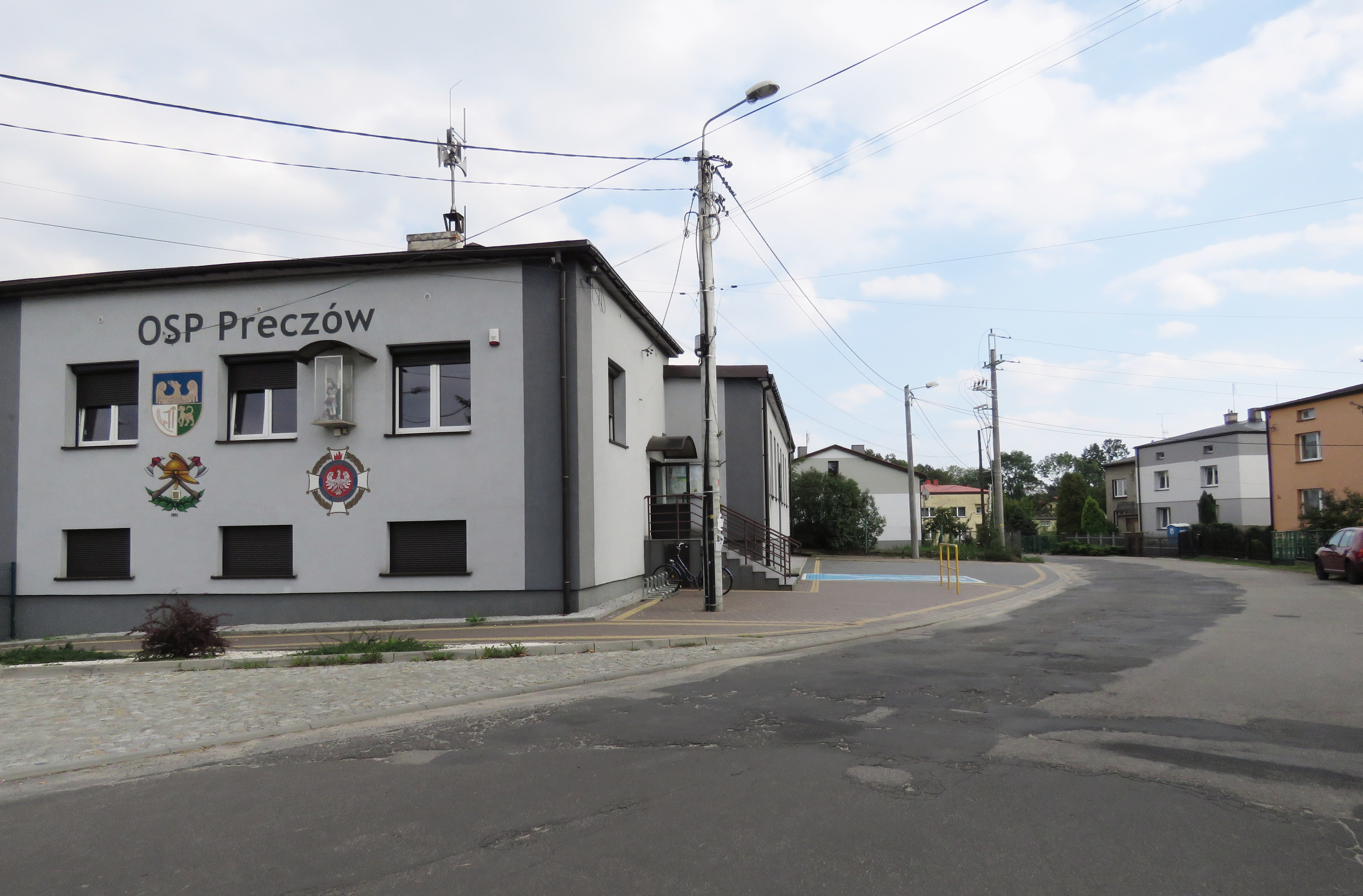

- Location within Poland
- Coordinates: 50°22′N 19°11′E
- Country: Poland
- Voivodeship: Silesian
- County: Będzin
- Gmina: Psary
- Population: 796

Preczów [ˈprɛt͡ʂuf] is a village in the administrative district of Gmina Psary, within Będzin County, Silesian Voivodeship, in southern Poland.
