= Gródków =

- Village
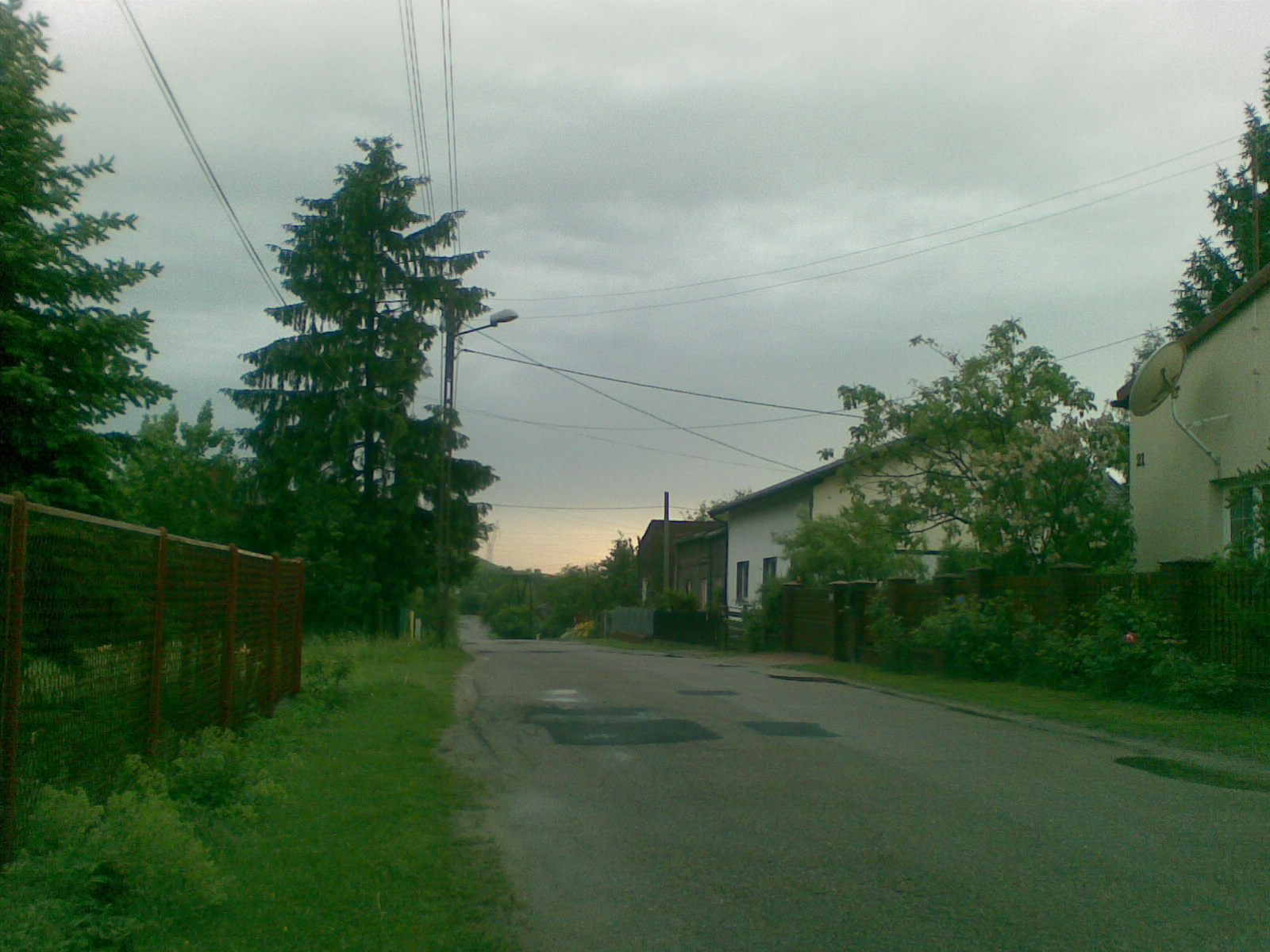

- Location within Poland
- Coordinates: 50°21′44″N 19°6′19″E
- Country: Poland
- Voivodeship: Silesian
- County: Będzin
- Gmina: Psary
- Population (2008): 921
- Time zone: UTC+1 (CET)
  - Summer (DST): UTC+2 (CEST)
- Postal code: 42–575
- Car plates: SBE

Gródków [ˈɡrutkuf] is a village in the administrative district of Gmina Psary, within Będzin County, Silesian Voivodeship, in southern Poland.
