= List of Wildlife on One episodes =

Wildlife on One is a British natural history television series, narrated by Sir David Attenborough and broadcast on BBC One. The series, spanning twenty–eight years, was one of the BBC's most successful documentary series dedicated to natural history. When the series was repeated on BBC Two it was retitled as Wildlife on Two.

During the course of the programme, 253 episodes of Wildlife on One aired over thirty-three series, between 6 January 1977 and 17 February 2005.

== Series overview ==
Series	Episodes	Originally released	
Series	Episodes	First released	Last released
1	8	6 January 1977	24 February 1977
2	4	19 July 1977	9 August 1977
3	6	6 April 1978	11 May 1978
4	6	31 May 1979	12 July 1979
5	6	17 January 1980	21 February 1980
6	6	2 September 1980	7 October 1980
7	8	9 January 1981	10 June 1981
8	5	8 September 1981	6 October 1981
9	6	7 January 1982	11 February 1982
10	5	9 September 1982	14 October 1982
11	5	13 January 1983	17 February 1983
12	5	10 November 1983	15 December 1983
13	5	8 January 1985	5 February 1985
14	5	4 September 1985	2 October 1985
15	9	26 January 1987	13 April 1987
16	10	12 January 1988	29 March 1988
17	9	27 February 1989	22 May 1989
18	10	7 January 1991	25 March 1991
19	10	6 January 1992	23 March 1992
20	10	7 January 1993	12 April 1993
21	10	6 January 1994	8 April 1994
22	13	6 April 1995	6 July 1995
23	13	28 March 1996	18 July 1996
24	5	13 February 1997	13 March 1997
25	5	22 July 1997	19 August 1997
26	9	10 March 1998	20 September 1998
27	6	18 April 1999	23 May 1999
28	4	23 August 1999	30 September 1999
29	9	6 August 2000	9 October 2000
30	11	16 April 2001	1 July 2001
31	10	24 February 2002	23 July 2002
32	10	30 March 2003	6 August 2003
33	10	1 November 2004	17 February 2005

== Episodes ==
=== Series 1 (1977) ===
No. overall	No. in season	Title	Original release date
1	1	"The Bird that Beat the US Navy"	6 January 1977
2	2	"Behind the Jaws"	13 January 1977
3	3	"The Year of the Deer"	20 January 1977
4	4	"Run Cheetah Run"	27 January 1977
5	5	"The American Eagle"	3 February 1977
6	6	"Prairie Dog Town"	10 February 1977
7	7	"A Safe Polar Bear is a Distant Polar Bear"	17 February 1977
8	8	"Charming Snakes"	24 February 1977

=== Series 2 (1977) ===
No. overall	No. in season	Title	Original release date
9	1	"The Private Life of the Barn Owl"	19 July 1977
10	2	"Bandicoots and Desert Frogs"	26 July 1977
11	3	"Garden Jungle"	2 August 1977
12	4	"Some of my Best Friends are Vultures"	9 August 1977

=== Series 3 (1978) ===
No. overall	No. in season	Title	Original release date
13	1	"Who's a Clever Birdie?"	6 April 1978
14	2	"At Home with Badgers"	13 April 1978
15	3	"Big Bill: The Story of a Heron"	20 April 1978
16	4	"Last Chance for the Grevy?"	27 April 1978
17	5	"Bob Cat"	4 May 1978
18	6	"Goldfish"	11 May 1978

=== Series 4 (1979) ===
No. overall	No. in season	Title	Original release date
19	1	"Squirrel on my Shoulder"	31 May 1979
20	2	"The Real Mr Ratty"	7 June 1979
21	3	"Return of the Fur Seal"	14 June 1979
22	4	"Scorpion"	21 June 1979
23	5	"Birds of the Volcanoes"	28 June 1979
24	6	"Fox Watch"	12 July 1979

=== Series 5 (1980) ===
No. overall	No. in season	Title	Original release date
25	1	"The Impossible Bird"	17 January 1980
26	2	"Zen: The Pigtail Monkey"	24 January 1980
27	3	"Rhino Rescue"	31 January 1980
28	4	"Vampire"	7 February 1980
29	5	"Amorous Amphibians"	14 February 1980
30	6	"A Wonderful Bird is the Pelican"	21 February 1980

=== Series 6 (1980) ===
No. overall	No. in season	Title	Original release date
31	1	"Gently Smiling Jaws"	2 September 1980
32	2	"Red River Safari"	9 September 1980
33	3	"Whale of a Tangle"	16 September 1980
34	4	"An Island Shall a Monster Make"	23 September 1980
35	5	"Wings Over the High Sierras"	30 September 1980
36	6	"Shipwreck"	7 October 1980

=== Series 7 (1981) ===
No. overall	No. in season	Title	Original release date
37	1	"Gannets Galore"	9 January 1981
38	2	"Wild Otter"	16 January 1981
39	3	"The Water Walkers"	22 January 1981
40	4	"Where the Fish are Friendly"	29 January 1981
41	5	"Flowers from the Flames"	5 February 1981
42	6	"Out in the Cold"	12 February 1981
43	7	"What Price the Countryside?"	7 April 1981
44	8	"Twentieth Century Fox"	10 June 1981

=== Series 8 (1981) ===
No. overall	No. in season	Title	Original release date
45	1	"Return of the Sea Eagle"	8 September 1981
46	2	"The Mouse's Tale"	15 September 1981
47	3	"Lady of the Spiders"	22 September 1981
48	4	"Orinoco Hog"	29 September 1981
49	5	"The Mysterious Bee"	6 October 1981

=== Series 9 (1982) ===
No. overall	No. in season	Title	Original release date
50	1	"Ambush at Masai Mara"	7 January 1982
51	2	"The Great Hedgehog Mystery"	14 January 1982
52	3	"The Gentle Giants"	21 January 1982
53	4	"Baboons Rule OK"	28 January 1982
54	5	"Encounter Underground"	4 February 1982
55	6	"St Lucia: Lake Wilderness"	11 February 1982

=== Series 10 (1982) ===
No. overall	No. in season	Title	Original release date
56	1	"The Bat that Cracked the Frog Code"	9 September 1982
57	2	"Yellowstone Below Zero"	16 September 1982
58	3	"The Serpent's Secrets"	23 September 1982
59	4	"The Dolphin Touch"	30 September 1982
60	5	"Grizzly"	14 October 1982

=== Series 11 (1983) ===
No. overall	No. in season	Title	Original release date
61	1	"The Dragon and the Damsel"	13 January 1983
62	2	"Sealion Summer"	20 January 1983
63	3	"Kusieb: the Vanishing River"	27 January 1983
64	4	"The Passing of the Buck"	10 February 1983
65	5	"A Touch of the Butterflies"	17 February 1983

=== Series 12 (1983) ===
No. overall	No. in season	Title	Original release date
66	1	"Run Rabbit Run"	10 November 1983
67	2	"Aliens from Inner Space"	17 November 1983
68	3	"Last Stronghold of the Eagles"	24 November 1983
69	4	"Sparrows of St James's"	8 December 1983
70	5	"Nightlife"	15 December 1983

=== Series 13 (1985) ===
No. overall	No. in season	Title	Original release date
71	1	"Pterdactyls - Alive?"	8 January 1985
72	2	"Roadrunner: Clown of the Desert"	15 January 1985
73	3	"New Father Thames"	22 January 1985
74	4	"Sailing with Whales"	29 January 1985
75	5	"Redtail"	5 February 1985

=== Series 14 (1985) ===
No. overall	No. in season	Title	Original release date
76	1	"The Fastest Claw in the West"	4 September 1985
77	2	"Titbits"	11 September 1985
78	3	"Sulawesi: Island of Discovery"	18 September 1985
79	4	"Marmot Mountain"	25 September 1985
80	5	"Sea Snakes: Friend or Foe"	2 October 1985

=== Series 15 (1987) ===
No. overall	No. in season	Title	Original release date
81	1	"Meerkats United"	26 January 1987
82	2	"The Bodysnatchers"	2 February 1987
83	3	"Serpents: Swiftlets and the Chasm of Gloom"	9 February 1987
84	4	"Case of the Vanishing Squirrel"	23 February 1987
85	5	"Birds of the Sun God"	2 March 1987
86	6	"Ladybird, Ladybird"	9 March 1987
87	7	"Nautilus: 500 Million Years Under the Sea"	16 March 1987
88	8	"In-Flight Movie"	23 March 1987
89	9	"Mysteries of the Chinese Cranes"	13 April 1987

=== Series 16 (1988) ===
No. overall	No. in season	Title	Original release date
90	1	"Who Really Killed Cock Robin?"	12 January 1988
91	2	"The Longest Nose in Africa"	19 January 1988
92	3	"Punk Puffins and Hard Rock"	26 January 1988
93	4	"Odd Noses of Borneo"	9 February 1988
94	5	"The Ravening Hordes"	16 February 1988
95	6	"Oasis"	23 February 1988
96	7	"The Tale of the Pregnant Male"	1 March 1988
97	8	"The Bee Team"	15 March 1988
98	9	"Kingdom of the Crabs"	22 March 1988
99	10	"Trivial Pursuit? The Natural Mystery of Play"	29 March 1988

=== Series 17 (1989) ===
No. overall	No. in season	Title	Original release date
100	1	"Blubber Lovers"	27 February 1989
101	2	"Unearthing the Mole"	6 March 1989
102	3	"Birdman of Afikin"	13 March 1989
103	4	"Kalahari Bigfoot"	3 April 1989
104	5	"Rockies and Rollers"	10 April 1989
105	6	"Under the Weather"	24 April 1989
106	7	"Whistling Hunters"	1 May 1989
107	8	"Jewel in the Sun"	8 May 1989
108	9	"Parrot Fashion"	22 May 1989

=== Series 18 (1991) ===
No. overall	No. in season	Title	Original release date
109	1	"Devilfish"	7 January 1991
110	2	"Backstreet Bandits"	14 January 1991
111	3	"Island of Monkeys"	21 January 1991
112	4	"The Haunted Huntress"	21 January 1991
113	5	"Lifesize"	28 January 1991
114	6	"Enter the Dragons"	4 February 1991
115	7	"Eat a Beaver, Save a Tree"	18 February 1991
116	8	"Sky Raider"	4 March 1991
117	9	"Beauty and the Beast"	11 March 1991
118	10	"The Transformers"	25 March 1991

=== Series 19 (1992) ===
No. overall	No. in season	Title	Original release date
119	1	"Too Close for Comfort?"	6 January 1992
120	2	"Invasion of the Killer Mink"	13 January 1992
121	3	"Sylvia the Star the Tern"	20 January 1992
122	4	"Flying Foresters"	27 January 1992
123	5	"When the Fish Come In"	3 February 1992
124	6	"The Prankster"	10 February 1992
125	7	"Barrels of Crude and Wallaroos"	17 February 1992
126	8	"Babies Beware"	9 March 1992
127	9	"Little Leviathans"	16 March 1992
128	10	"Pandas aren't Always Cuddly"	23 March 1992

=== Series 20 (1993) ===
No. overall	No. in season	Title	Original release date
129	1	"March of the Flamebirds"	7 January 1993
130	2	"Itaye and the Fig Tree Troop"	14 January 1993
131	3	"The Swarm"	21 January 1993
132	4	"Noses of Nancite"	28 January 1993
133	5	"Clowns of the Air"	4 February 1993
134	6	"Wanted Alive : The Story of the Black-Footed Ferret, the Most Wanted Animal in the West"	18 February 1993
135	7	"They Came from the Sea"	11 March 1993
136	8	"Haunt of the Fishing Owl"	18 March 1993
137	9	"Springbok of the Kalahari"	1 April 1993
138	10	"Shadow of the Hare"	12 April 1993

=== Series 21 (1994) ===
No. overall	No. in season	Title	Original release date
139	1	"Orangutans: Out on a Limb"	6 January 1994
140	2	"Alligator Hole"	13 January 1994
141	3	"Tiger of the Highlands"	20 January 1994
142	4	"Nature's Neons"	27 January 1994
143	5	"Malice in Wonderland: A Coral Reef Drama"	10 February 1994
144	6	"White Birds of Winter"	17 February 1994
145	7	"The Storm Troop"	24 February 1994
146	8	"Gremlins of the Night"	10 March 1994
147	9	"A Graze with Danger"	17 March 1994
148	10	"Earwig"	8 April 1994

=== Series 22 (1995) ===
No. overall	No. in season	Title	Original release date
149	1	"The Tale of the Big Bad Fox"	6 April 1995
150	2	"A Monkey for All Seasons"	13 April 1995
151	3	"Night of the Leopard"	20 April 1995
152	4	"King of Kingfishers"	27 April 1995
153	5	"Sea Otters: The Clam Busters"	4 May 1995
154	6	"Rainbow Warriors"	11 May 1995
155	7	"The Tale of the Peacock and the Tiger"	18 May 1995
156	8	"Nightgliders"	25 May 1995
157	9	"Lake of the Flies"	1 June 1995
158	10	"Baywatch: A Dolphin's View"	15 June 1995
159	11	"The Besieged: War of the Termites"	22 June 1995
160	12	"Advance of the Armadillo"	29 June 1995
161	13	"The Wild Bush Budgie"	6 July 1995

=== Series 23 (1996) ===
No. overall	No. in season	Title	Original release date
162	1	"Hippos Out of Water"	28 March 1996
163	2	"Meerkats Divided"	4 April 1996
164	3	"The Dolphin Diaries"	11 April 1996
165	4	"Stoats in the Priory"	18 April 1996
166	5	"Thunderbirds"	25 April 1996
167	6	"Bat-Eared Fox"	2 May 1996
168	7	"Lost Lakes of the Pacific"	9 May 1996
169	8	"Possums: Tales of the Unexpected"	16 May 1996
170	9	"Gannets: The Storm Birds"	23 May 1996
171	10	"The Rat Race"	28 May 1996
172	11	"Last of the Rhinos"	4 June 1996
173	12	"Deadly Liaisons"	18 June 1996
174	13	"The Immortal Salamander"	18 July 1996

=== Series 24 (1997) ===
No. overall	No. in season	Title	Original release date
175	1	"Pygmy Chimpanzee: The Last Great Ape"	13 February 1997
176	2	"Reef Encounter"	20 February 1997
177	3	"The Lion's King"	27 February 1997
178	4	"The Eagle Empire"	6 March 1997
179	5	"Butterfly: Beauty or the Beast?"	13 March 1997

=== Series 25 (1997) ===
No. overall	No. in season	Title	Original release date
180	1	"Otters: The Truth"	22 July 1997
181	2	"Zebra: The Trailblazers"	29 July 1997
182	3	"Wild Boar: King of the Wildwood"	5 August 1997
183	4	"Piranhas"	12 August 1997
184	5	"The Beetles: Record Breakers"	19 August 1997

=== Series 26 (1998) ===
No. overall	No. in season	Title	Original release date
185	1	"Bands on the Run"	10 March 1998
186	2	"Wolves in White"	17 March 1998
187	3	"Small Cats, Serval Secrets"	24 March 1998
188	4	"Crowned Lemurs: Blade Runners"	31 March 1998
189	5	"Pine Marten: Spirit of the Wood"	7 April 1998
190	6	"Where Lemmings Dare"	14 April 1998
191	7	"Uninvited Guests"	21 April 1998
192	8	"Birds in Black"	28 April 1998
193	9	"Spirit of the Mustang"	20 September 1998

=== Series 27 (1999) ===
No. overall	No. in season	Title	Original release date
194	1	"Should Elephants Weep?"	18 April 1999
195	2	"21st Century Safari"	25 April 1999
196	3	"Squirrels Under Siege"	2 May 1999
197	4	"Ospreys: The Fish Hawks"	9 May 1999
198	5	"Reefwise"	16 May 1999
199	6	"Giraffe: The Impossible Animal"	23 May 1999

=== Series 28 (1999) ===
No. overall	No. in season	Title	Original release date
200	1	"Birds Behaving Badly"	23 August 1999
201	2	"Spiders from Mars"	16 September 1999
202	3	"Hyenas: Heroes or Villains?"	23 September 1999
203	4	"Bushbabies: A Leap in the Dark"	30 September 1999

=== Series 29 (2000) ===
No. overall	No. in season	Title	Original release date
204	1	"Pussies Galore"	6 August 2000
205	2	"Bear Crime: Caught in the Act"	13 August 2000
206	3	"Warthogs Hogging the Limelight"	20 August 2000
207	4	"Global Swarming"	27 August 2000
208	5	"Gelada Baboons: The Battles of Braveheart"	10 September 2000
209	6	"The Real Macaw"	17 September 2000
210	7	"India's Wild Dogs: The Wild Bunch"	1 October 2000
211	8	"Hyrax: Little Brother of the Elephant"	2 October 2000
212	9	"Up with the Gibbons"	9 October 2000

=== Series 30 (2001) ===
No. overall	No. in season	Title	Original release date
213	1	"Water Vole: A Life on the Edge"	16 April 2001
214	2	"Sensitive Sharks"	29 April 2001
215	3	"Chimpanzees: Toolmakers of Bossou"	6 May 2001
216	4	"Pelicans: Taking the Plunge"	13 May 2001
217	5	"Foxy Business"	20 May 2001
218	6	"Operation Thunderball"	27 May 2001
219	7	"Dingoes: Outlaws of the Outback"	3 June 2001
220	8	"Giant Otters: Wolves of the River"	10 June 2001
221	9	"The Octopus Challenge"	17 June 2001
222	10	"Monkeys of the Rock"	24 June 2001
223	11	"Enter the Mantis"	1 July 2001

=== Series 31 (2002) ===
No. overall	No. in season	Title	Original release date
224	1	"Gangland Lemurs"	24 February 2002
225	2	"African Penguin: A Cool Bird in a Hot Spot"	3 March 2002
226	3	"Polar Bears on Thin Ice"	23 April 2002
227	4	"Iguanas: Living Like Dinosaurs"	30 April 2002
228	5	"Navy Seals"	7 May 2002
229	6	"Citizen Cane Toad"	14 May 2002
230	7	"Ostriches in the Race for Survival"	21 May 2002
231	8	"Space Age Reptile"	28 May 2002
232	9	"Beasts on the Streets"	2 July 2002
233	10	"Be an Animal"	23 July 2002

=== Series 32 (2003) ===
No. overall	No. in season	Title	Original release date
234	1	"Super Mums"	30 March 2003
235	2	"Dolphins: Deep Thinkers?"	11 June 2003
236	3	"Winning Dads"	15 June 2003
237	4	"Dragons"	18 June 2003
238	5	"Techno Wolf"	25 June 2003
239	6	"African Assassin: A Wildlife Whodunit"	2 July 2003
240	7	"Amazon Assassin: A Wildlife Whodunit"	16 July 2003
241	8	"Peregrine: Nature's Top Gun"	23 July 2003
242	9	"Beavers: The Master Builders"	30 July 2003
243	10	"Sensitive Scorpion"	6 August 2003

=== Series 33 (2004–05) ===
No. overall	No. in season	Title	Original release date
244	1	"Bears on the Black Run"	1 November 2004
245	2	"Squirrels: Are they Tough Enough?"	8 November 2004
246	3	"Monitor Lizard: Africa's Greatest Thief"	15 November 2004
247	4	"Gadgets Galore"	25 November 2004
248	5	"Capuchins: The Monkey Puzzle"	9 December 2004
249	6	"Dragonfly: Beauty or Beast?"	16 December 2004
250	7	"King Croc"	20 January 2005
251	8	"Kea: The Smartest Parrot"	27 January 2005
252	9	"Wildebeest: The Super Herd"	3 February 2005
253	10	"Crabs: Claw Wars"	17 February 2005
