= Vampire fish =

Vampire fish is a colloquial name given to the following varieties of fish:

- Candiru (fish) (Vandellia cirrhosa), a species of parasitic freshwater catfish
- Cynodon meionactis, a species of dogtooth tetra
- Payara, a species of dogtooth tetra
- Sea lamprey, a parasitic lamprey

== See also ==
- Dracula fish (Danionella dracula)
- Vampire squid (Vampyroteuthis infernalis)
- Vampyronassa rhodanica ("vampire fish trap"), an extinct cephalopod
