= HMS Vampire =

Two ships of the Royal Navy have been named HMS Vampire:

- HMS Vampire, a V-class destroyer launched in 1917 and serving with the Royal Navy until 1933, when she was transferred to the Royal Australian Navy.
- HMS Vampire (P72), the lead ship of her class of submarines. Served from 1942 until her scrapping in 1950.

== See also ==
- HMAS Vampire for Australian ships of the name
