= Vampire: Netherworld =

Book by Richard Lee Byers

- Author: Richard Lee Byers
- Language: English
- Series: World of Darkness
- Publication date: 1995
- Publication place: United States
- Pages: 330
- ISBN: 0061054739

Vampire: Netherworld is a novel by Richard Lee Byers published by Boxtree Ltd in 1995.

== Plot summary ==
Vampire: Netherworld is a Vampire: The Masquerade novel about a mortal named Zane who gets caught up in events regarding the Kindred, and an ancient vampire named Sartak saves his life.

== Reception ==
Andy Butcher reviewed Vampire: Netherworld for Arcane magazine, rating it a 7 out of 10 overall. Butcher comments that "makes for an enjoyable read and offers some insight into areas of the game world that you may not have considered."

== Reviews ==
- Review by Edward Bryant (1995) in Locus, #415 August 1995
- Review by Don D'Ammassa (1995) in Science Fiction Chronicle, #187 December 1995 – January 1996
- Review by Catherine B. Krusberg (1995) in The Vampire's Crypt #12, Fall 1995
- Review by John D. Owen (1996) in Vector 189
