= Vampiro (disambiguation) =

Vampiro (Ian Richard Hodgkinson, born 1967) is a Canadian professional wrestler.

Vampiro may also refer to:

- Vampiro (comics), a fictional character in the Marvel Comics universe
- Vampiro (cocktail), a mixed drink based on orange juice and tequila

== See also ==
- Vampiro Americano, a ring name of American professional wrestler John Layfield
