= Vampire (EP) =

2017 studio album by Akina Nakamori

EP by Akina Nakamori
- Released: 3 May 2017
- Recorded: United States, 2016−2017
- Genre: J-pop
- Length: 23:26 (Vampire); 70:25 (Belie+Vampire)
- Language: Japanese
- Label: Universal Music Japan
- Producers: Naoshi Fujikura; Don Flamingo

Akina Nakamori chronology
Belie (2016)	Vampire (2017)	Cage (2017)

Vampire is a cover EP by Japanese singer Akina Nakamori. It was released on 3 May 2017 under Universal Music Japan.

== Release history ==
At first, the Vampire was released in 2016 as intended to be only as a part of the limited edition of album named "BELIE+Vampire". In 2017, on the year of her 35th debut anniversary celebration, the Vampire was released individually and received "special-prize" re-release in 2023.

== Chart performance ==
Vampire debuted at number 48 on the Oricon Album weekly chart and charted for 3 weeks. Belie + Vampire version of the album debut at number 8 on the Oricon Weekly Charts and chart over 9 weeks.

== Track listing ==
No.	Title	Original Performer	Length
1.	"Dounimo Tomaranai"	Linda Yamamoto	3:00
2.	"Ah, Mujou"	Ann Lewis	4:21
3.	"Yadonashi"	Twist	3:52
4.	"Sexual Violet No.1"	Masahiro Kuwana	4:43
5.	"Dancing All Night"	Yoshinori Monta	4:09
6.	"Kizetsusuru Hodo Nayamashii"	Char	3:18

== Release history ==
=== Belie+Vampire ===
Year	Format(s)	Serial number	Label(s)	Ref.
2017	UHQCD+LP	UPCH-7207	UMJ	

=== Vampire ===
Year	Format(s)	Serial number	Label(s)	Ref.
2017	UHQCD	UPCH-7288	UMJ	
2023	CD	UPCY-7878	UMJ	
2024	LP	UPJY-9384	UMJ	
