= Chrobakowe =

- Village
- Location within Poland
- Coordinates: 50°23′45″N 19°09′38″E
- Country: Poland
- Voivodeship: Silesian
- County: Będzin
- Gmina: Psary

Chrobakowe [xrɔbaˈkɔvɛ] is a village in the administrative district of Gmina Psary, within Będzin County, Silesian Voivodeship, in southern Poland.
