= HMAS Vampire =

Two ships of the Royal Australian Navy (RAN) have been named HMAS Vampire.

- HMAS Vampire (D68), a V-class destroyer launched for the Royal Navy in 1917. As HMS Vampire, she served in World War I, then was transferred to the RAN in 1933. As HMAS Vampire, she served in World War II, and was sunk by air attack off Ceylon on 9 April 1942.
- HMAS Vampire (D11), a Daring-class destroyer launched in 1956. She was paid off in 1986 and is preserved as a museum ship at the Australian National Maritime Museum.

== Battle honours ==
Six battle honours were awarded to ships named HMAS Vampire:

- Calabria 1940
- Libya 1940–41
- Greece 1941
- Crete 1941
- Indian Ocean 1941–42
- Malaysia 1964–66

An additional battle honour ("Aegean 1944") was carried by the Daring class destroyer. This honour was awarded to the British submarine HMS Vampire, but until 1989, honours awarded to British warships were also inherited by Australian ships of the name. Any future RAN vessels named HMAS Vampire will not carry this honour.

== See also ==
- HMS Vampire for British ships of the same name.
