= Onslow (ship) =

Several ships have been named Onslow:

- Onslow (1734 EIC ship) was an East Indiaman launched on the Thames in 1734. She made four voyages for the British East India Company (EIC) to India, China, and South-East Asia before she was sold in 1748 for breaking up.
- Onslow (1750 EIC ship) was an East Indiaman launched on the Thames in 1750. She made four voyages for the EIC to India, China, and South-East Asia before she was sold in 1761 for breaking up.
- Onslow (1795 ship) was a Spanish vessel launched in 1789 that was taken in prize in 1795. She became a Liverpool-based slave ship in the triangular trade in enslaved people. She made one complete slave trading voyage before a French privateer captured her in 1797 as she was just on her way to embark slaves for a second voyage.
- Onslow (1817 ship) was launched at Onslow, Nova Scotia in 1817. She moved to England in 1818 and traded with Canada and the West Indies. She foundered on 30 July 1829.

== See also ==
- HMS Onslow – one of three actual or intended vessels of the British Royal Navy
- HMAS Onslow – a submarine of the Royal Australian Navy
