= Kevin Walton =

Royal Navy officer & polar explorer (1918-2009)

- Kevin Walton in Antarctica in 1947
- Born: 15 May 1918; Kobe, Japan
- Died: 13 April 2009 (aged 90)
- Military career
- Allegiance: United Kingdom
- Branch: Royal Navy
- Service years: 1939–1952
- Rank: Lieutenant
- Units: HMS Rodney; HMS Onslow; HMS Duncan
- Conflicts: Second World War; Battle of the Denmark Strait; Battle of the Barents Sea; Battle of the Atlantic; Malta convoys
- Awards: George Cross; Distinguished Service Cross; Mentioned in Despatches; Queen's Commendation for Brave Conduct; Polar Medal

Eric William Kevin Walton GC, DSC (15 May 1918 – 13 April 2009) was an engineer officer in the Royal Navy during World War II and, in 1946, was a winner of the Albert Medal, which in 1971 was superseded by the George Cross.

== Early life ==
Walton was born in Kobe in Japan on 15 May 1918. He was the son of William Heward Murray Walton, a clergyman and missionary, and his wife Myra (née Hebbert), whose family had served for four generations in the Indian Civil Service. His godfather was Howard Somervell, a member of the 1922 and 1924 Everest expeditions. Later, encouraged by Somervell, Walton developed an interest in climbing. He spent his early years living in Japan with his parents before coming back to Britain to spend four years being brought up by a great aunt and uncle while his parents returned to their missionary work in Japan. Like his father, Walton was educated at Monkton Combe School and Imperial College London, where he trained as a Civil Engineer.

== Royal Navy ==
Walton joined the Royal Navy as an engineer officer at the start of World War II, and took part in various naval actions during the next five years. On 26 May 1941 he was serving on HMS Rodney, part of Admiral Sir James Somerville’s naval force which attacked the German battleship Bismarck with Fairey Swordfish torpedo-bombers, taking out Bismarck's steering apparatus, and then sinking her with gunfire in the Atlantic Ocean.

Walton later served as engineer officer in destroyers and took part in the Barents Sea action aboard HMS Onslow against the German cruiser Admiral Hipper and the Deutschland-class cruiser Lützow on 31 December 1942. Onslow was holed during the action, and it was because of Walton's skill and determination that Onslow was able to stay afloat long enough to reach port. For this action Walton received the Distinguished Service Cross. He was Mentioned in Despatches while aboard HMS Duncan in the North Atlantic, again on destroyer escort duty. He took part in several of the Malta Convoys and served in the Far East towards the end of the war.

== Albert Medal ==
After the war, Walton (still in the Navy) became involved in the work of the British Antarctic Survey. On 26 August 1946 another member of the party, Major Tonkin, fell into a crevasse; the rescue that followed led to Walton being awarded the Albert Medal on 28 May 1948, and the following citation was published in the London Gazette on 8 June 1948:

Whitehall, May 28, 1948.

The KING has been pleased to award the Albert Medal to Temporary Lieutenant (E) Eric William Kevin Walton, D.S.C., R.N., a member of the Falkland Islands Dependencies Survey, in recognition of his gallantry in the following circumstances:—

At about 12 noon on 24th August, 1946, while on a sledging journey, a member of the Survey fell through a badly-bridged crevasse and disappeared. Major Tonkin had fallen some 40 feet and was jammed in a narrow part of the crevasse. Ropes were lowered to him and he managed to get loops round his forearms, but no higher, and it was found impossible to pull him out as he was jammed in the ice. Lieutenant Walton volunteered to be lowered in the crevasse to free Major Tonkin by chipping. As an ice axe could not be used in the constricted space of the crevasse, the spike was sawn off and used as a hand tool. Lieutenant Walton was lowered down a wider part of the crevasse and worked his way along until he reached and succeeded in freeing Major Tonkin, who was eventually pulled to the surface, after having been three hours down the crevasse. During that time. Lieutenant Walton was lowered down to him on five separate occasions, remaining down for considerable periods on each occasion. His persistence was most commendable, and it was due solely to his efforts that Major Tonkin was finally rescued.

With Dr Richard Butson, who also went on to win the Albert Medal for heroism, Walton climbed several previously unconquered Antarctic peaks, some of which rise to heights of almost 13,000 feet. For their work in the Antarctic Walton and Butson received the Polar Medal. Walton also received its Clasp (Antarctic 1946–7) and Queen's Commendation for another crevasse rescue on South Georgia in 1952.

When the Royal Warrant of 1971 entitled him to the use of the post-nominal letters 'GC', he chose to continue to wear his original Albert Medal with his other medals and awards.

== Later life ==
Walton had various occupations on leaving the Royal Navy, including British Secretary of the International Antarctic Expedition, when he kept huskies in the gardens of the Royal Geographical Society in London; mechanic for Aston Martin in the Le Mans 24-hour race, and the first instructor for the Outward Bound Mountain School in the Lake District. For six months Walton was one of the crew of a yacht which landed agents in Albania. This career ended on the discovery that details of the operation were being leaked from MI6 by the double-agent Kim Philby.

He taught workshop engineering at Oundle School, at the Royal Naval College, Dartmouth, and at Malvern College. He was involved in the construction of a nuclear power station in Wales and in British Voluntary Service Overseas (VSO). He was a member of The Victoria Cross and George Cross Association. In the 1980s Walton pioneered the "Opening Windows on Engineering" scheme, where professional engineers visited UK schools to inform the pupils about engineering and to get them interested in it as a future career. Initially operated by the Institution of Civil Engineers, of whose Council Walton was a member at the time, the scheme was later extended as the "Neighbourhood Engineers" project, its administration being transferred to the Engineering Council. Today, it is the "Engineering Ambassadors" programme, run by the Science, Technology, Engineering & Mathematics Network.

In 1948 Kevin Walton married Ruth Yule, with whom he had one son and three daughters. His son Jonathan Walton is also engaged in Antarctic research, and they are believed to be the only father and son to hold the Polar Medal.

Kevin Walton is commemorated by Mount Walton in Graham Land, part of the British Antarctic Territory.

== Publications ==
- Two years in the Antarctic by E.W. Kevin Walton Published by Lutterworth, London (1955)
- Making things Work: Great Achievements in Engineering by] Michael Low, Frank McKim and Kevin Walton, with a foreword by H.R.H. the Duke of Edinburgh Published by Cassell (1977)
- A Portrait of Antarctica by Kevin and Jonathan Walton Published by Philip's (1983) ISBN 0-540-01075-8
- Of Dogs and Men: Fifty Years in the Antarctic by Kevin Walton and Rick Atkinson Published by Images (GB) (1996) ISBN 1-897817-55-X
