= Tự Do =

Vietnamese refugee vessel in Australia

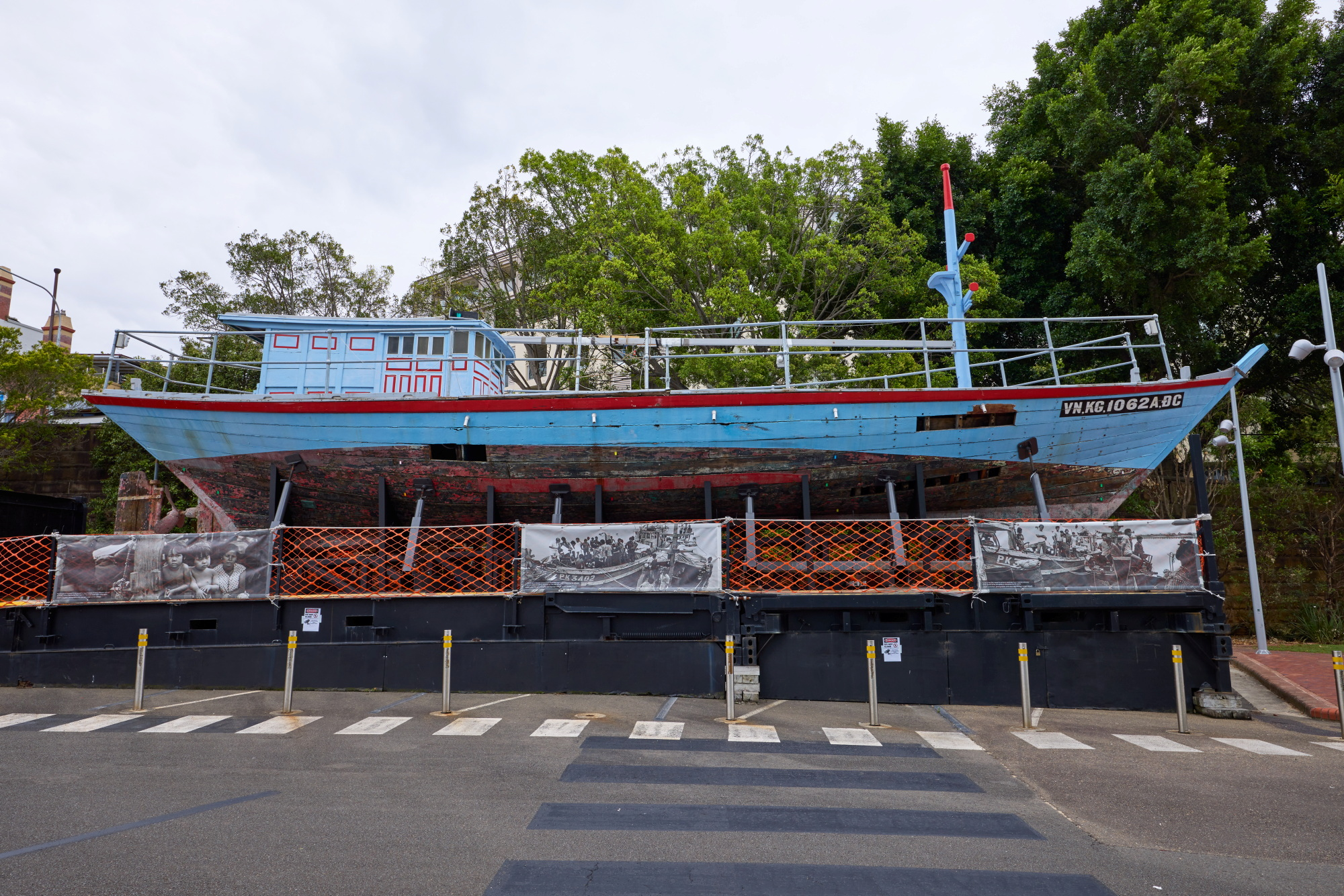
- Tự Do at the Australian National Maritime Museum

History
- Name: Tự Do
- Builder: Lư Thành Tân
- Acquired: 4 September 1990
- Status: Museum vessel

General characteristics
- Type: Refugee vessel; former fishing vessel
- Length: 18.25m
- Beam: 5.2m
- Draught: 1.8m
- Propulsion: Single screw driven by a three-cylinder Jinil diesel engine

Tự Do is a Vietnamese refugee vessel held in the collection of the Australian National Maritime Museum in Sydney, Australia. The vessel arrived in Darwin, Northern Territory, on 21 November 1977 carrying 31 Vietnamese refugees. Its name Tự do is Vietnamese for "freedom". The Australian National Maritime Museum's current interpertive material uses the form Tự do (lower case 'd'), including it's account of Lư Thành Tân naming the vessel while it was being built.

Built in Vietnam as a wooden fishing vessel, Tự Do was commissioned by Vietnamese businessman Lư Thành Tân after the fall of Saigon in 1975 and as part of a plan to leave Vietnam with his family and other passengers. The vessel is associated with the movement of Vietnamese refugees known as the "boat people". It was acquired by the Australian National Maritime Museum in 1990 and has since been conserved, restored and interpreted as part of the National Maritime Collection and the museum Fleet.

The NSW Migration Heritage Centre describes Tự Do as tangible evidence of a key phase of Australian migration history and as one of the most thoroughly documented refugee boats held in an Australian public collection. The vessel has also been discussed in academic writing on migration heritage and museum interpretation, including work by Denis Byrne and Kim Tao.

== Background ==
After the end of the Vietnam War and the fall of Saigon in 1975, large numbers of people left Vietnam by sea. Many travelled in small boats to neighbouring countries or attempted longer voyages in search of resettlement.

Lư Thành Tân was a store owner from Phú Quốc Island in southern Vietnam. Museum accounts record that he had fought with South Vietnam during the war and believed his family faced a difficult future under the new communist government. In 1975, he pooled resources with friends and arranged for the construction of a fishing vessel that could be used to leave Vietnam.

The story of Tự Do forms part of a broader history of Vietnamese refugee arrivals in Australia in the late 1970s. Historian Klaus Neumann, writing in Inside Story, identifies Tự Do among the Vietnamese refugee boats that reached Darwin in November 1977 and notes that it carried 31 people, including seven children under the age of ten, to Australia.

=== Construction and description ===
Tự Do was built in Vietnam in 1975–76 using locally produced timber. It was constructed as a dragnet fishing boat typical of the Phú Quốc region. The Australian National Maritime Museum records the vessel as 18.25 metres in length overall, 5.2 metres in breadth and 1.8 metres in draught. It has a mast forward and a cabin and wheelhouse aft; it is powered by a three-cylinder Jinil diesel engine. Tự Do bears the registration number VN,KG1062A,ÐC on its hull.

Before the voyage, Lư used Tự Do for fishing around Phú Quốc, which helped present the vessel as an ordinary working boat while preparations for departure were made. The catch also helped pay for much-needed supplies. According to the Australian National Maritime Museum, the boat's sky blue colour scheme was chosen to help it blend in with the ocean.

In a later Signals article, Roland Leikauf described Tự Do as an expertly built fishing boat and a representation of traditional wooden boatbuilding, rather than a makeshift or improvised vessel.

=== Voyage to Australia ===
Tự Do departed Vietnam on 16 September 1977. Before leaving Vietnam, Lư created the appearance that the vessel had engine problems, reducing official attention on the boat. A more powerful engine was then installed before the passengers departed at night. The group included Lư, his pregnant wife Tuyet, their children Dzung, Dao and Mo, as well as relatives, friends, neighbours and other passengers.

During the departure, a head count revealed that Lư's six-year-old daughter Dzung had been left on shore. Despite opposition from some passengers, the vessel returned to collect her before beginning the journey.

Tự Do crossed the Gulf of Thailand and reached Mersing, Malaysia, where some passengers disembarked as refugees. Lư had relatives in the United States, but after unsuccessful attempts to secure resettlement through United States immigration channels, he decided to continue towards Australia with the remaining passengers.

The vessel travelled through Indonesian waters and continued south. Off Flores, Tự Do encountered another Vietnamese refugee boat, PK3402, which had run aground. Tự Do assisted the other vessel and towed it across the Timor Sea towards northern Australia.

Tự Do arrived in Darwin on 21 November 1977. The voyage covered more than 6,000 kilometres (3,700 mi). Lư and his crew navigated using a compass and a map torn from the lid of a school desk.

== Arrival and later ownership ==
After arrival in Australia, the passengers were processed in Darwin. The Lu family was later transferred to the Wacol Migrant Hostel in Brisbane, where they were granted asylum after six months. Tuyet Lu later gave birth to the family's youngest child, Quoc, in Brisbane.

In 1978, while at Wacol, Lư arranged to sell Tự Do to a Darwin resident. The vessel was later sold to a Cairns owner in 1985. During this later private ownership, Tự Do was altered for use in Australia. Changes included new seating and rails, the loss of some fittings associated with the 1977 voyage, and several changes to the paint scheme, while the main hull, deck and cabin structure survived.

=== Acquisition by the Australian National Maritime Museum ===
The Australian National Maritime Museum acquired Tự Do in 1990. According to Lindl Lawton, the museum had decided to acquire a refugee boat to represent an important phase in Australia's migration history, but locating a surviving vessel was difficult because many refugee boats had been destroyed after arrival as a quarantine precaution.

At the time of acquisition, little was known about Tự Do's history beyond its name and its association with Vietnamese refugees. In 1995, museum staff located Lư and his family in northern New South Wales. Lư and his son Mo later visited the museum and provided information about the vessel's construction, appearance and voyage.

The museum also holds a related Tự Do collection, which includes approximately 100 items associated with the vessel. These include the boat, personal effects donated by the Lu family, photographs of the arrival of Tự Do in Darwin by photographer Michael Jensen, portraits of the Lu family, and replica provisions purchased in Vietnam with the assistance of Lư.

=== Conservation and restoration ===
In 2003, the museum prepared a Vessel Management Plan for Tự Do and began restoring the boat to reflect its appearance at the time of its arrival in Darwin. The work was informed by several forms of evidence, including oral histories, interviews with the Lu family and later owners, research into Vietnamese wooden boatbuilding, and Michael Jensen's 1977 photographs of the vessel.

Early restoration work focused on making the vessel structurally sound while retaining original material where possible. The wheelhouse was removed and strengthened, the Jinil diesel engine was repaired, and damaged hull timbers were replaced with Australian hardwoods selected for their similarity to the original Southeast Asian timbers.

The conservation work aimed to retain original fabric wherever possible. Lawton reported in 2005 that more than 80 percent of the original timber remained, although some rotten planking had to be replaced and parts of the vessel were refastened using trunnels, a traditional wooden fastening method.

Later work focused on restoring features visible in Jensen's arrival photographs. These included the deck covering, temporary barricades, winch and stern toilet. The museum also used paint analysis, photographic evidence and information from the Lu family to return the boat to an earlier blue colour scheme with red anti-fouling below the waterline.

Following the restoration, the museum described Tự Do as the only fully operational refugee boat displayed on water in Australia. The museum's migration display also notes that in 2012, after an almost decade-long restoration program, Tự Do was returned to the configuration documented in Jensen's arrival photographs.

== Interpretation and exhibitions ==
Tự Do has been interpreted in several museum exhibitions and programs relating to migration, refugee journeys and maritime history. The NSW Migration Heritage Centre notes that the vessel has been used in museum displays including Tears, Fears and Cheers, Smugglers: Contraband and Customs 1901–2001, and Voyage from Vietnam.

In 2026, the Australian National Maritime Museum presented Voyage to Freedom – The story of Tự Do, an exhibition centred on the vessel and the experiences of Vietnamese refugees who travelled from Vietnam to Darwin. The exhibition includes oral histories collected by the museum from 1995 onwards and presents objects connected to the voyage. Tao has examined Tự Do as a case study in representing migration by boat in museum settings, discussing the vessel's acquisition, research, restoration and interpretation at the Australian National Maritime Museum. Byrne has used the vessel to consider broader questions about migration heritage and what gives an object such as Tự Do meaning within Australian museum practice. Leikauf has discussed Tự Do in the wider context of why few refugee vessels arriving in Australia between 1975 and 1979 were preserved in museum collections.

== Significance ==
Tự Do is one of a small number of Vietnamese refugee vessels preserved in Australian museum collections. The Australian National Maritime Museum uses the vessel to interpret the experiences of Vietnamese refugees who left Vietnam by sea after the end of the Vietnam War, as well as broader histories of migration, asylum and maritime journeys to Australia.

The NSW Migration Heritage Centre describes Tự Do as having historic value as tangible evidence of Vietnamese refugee experiences and a key phase of Australia's migration history. It also states that the vessel has significance for descendants of Vietnamese refugees as a way of understanding family migration stories and the history of Vietnam.

The vessel has been discussed in several issues of the Australian National Maritime Museum's magazine Signals, including articles by Helen Trepa, Lindl Lawton, Kim Tao and Roland Leikauf. It has also been considered in independent academic and public commentary on migration heritage, refugee history and museum interpretation.

== See also ==
- Vietnamese boat people
- Australian National Maritime Museum
- History of immigration to Australia
- Vietnamese Australians
- Fall of Saigon
