= Australian National Maritime Museum =

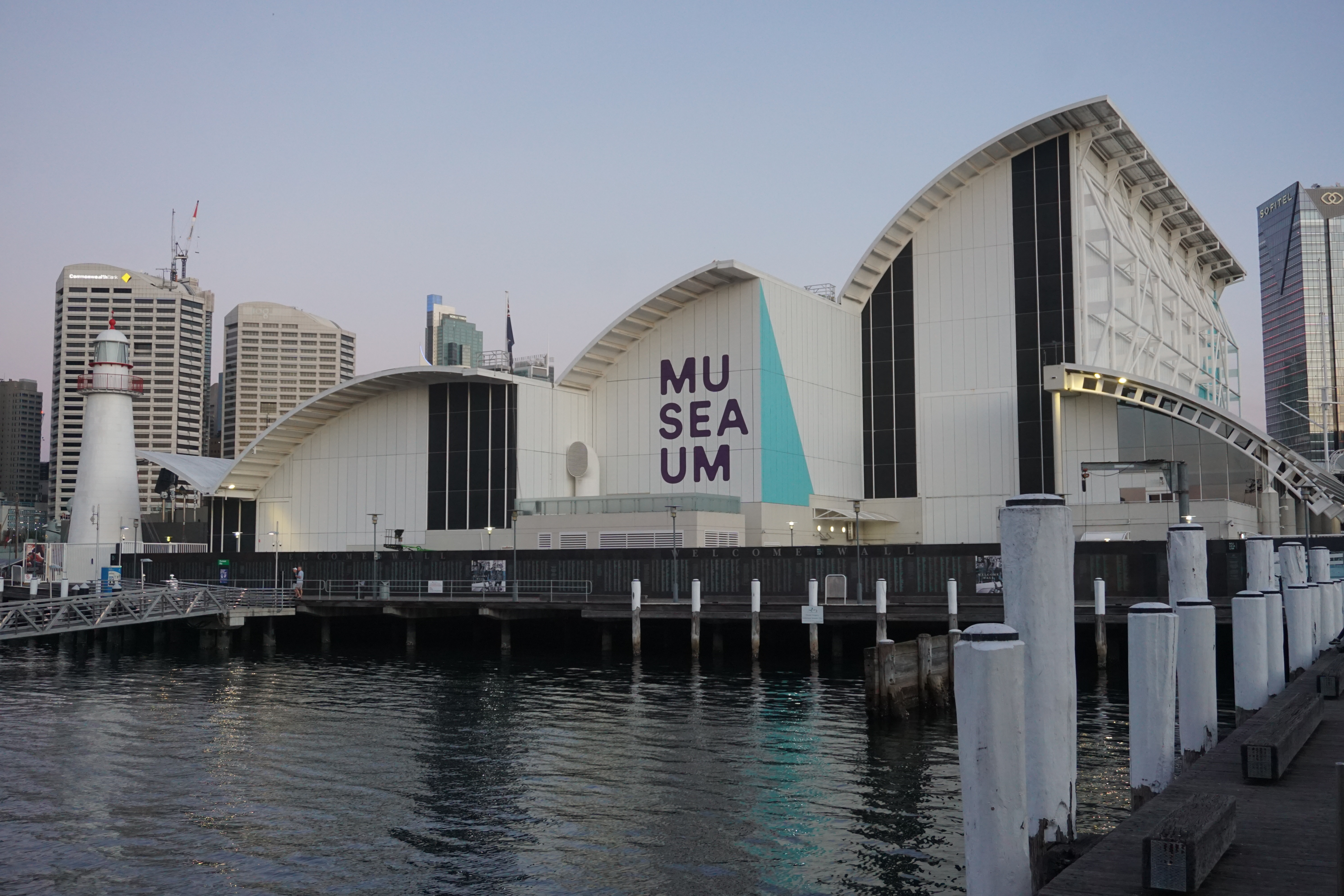
- Australian National Maritime Museum

- Location within Sydney
- Established: 1991; 35 years ago
- Location: Darling Harbour, Pyrmont, Sydney, Australia (Map)
- Coordinates: 33°52′9″S 151°11′55″E
- Type: Maritime museum
- Director: Daryl Karp AM (2022–present)
- Chairperson: John Mullen
- Architects: Philip Cox, Richardson Taylor & Partners
- Owner: Department of Communications and the Arts
- Public transit access: Pyrmont Bay light rail stop; Sydney Buses
- Website: www.sea.museum

The Australian National Maritime Museum (ANMM) is a federally operated maritime museum in Darling Harbour, Sydney. After considering the idea of establishing a maritime museum, the federal government announced that a national maritime museum would be constructed at Darling Harbour, tied into the New South Wales state government's redevelopment of the area for the Australian bicentenary in 1988. The museum building was designed by Philip Cox, and although an opening date of 1988 was initially set, construction delays, cost overruns, and disagreements between the state and federal governments over funding responsibility pushed the opening to 1991.

One of six museums directly operated by the federal government, the ANMM is the only one located outside of the Australian Capital Territory. The museum is structured around seven main galleries, focusing on the relationships between Indigenous Australians and the sea, the navigation of Australian waters, travel to Australia by sea and the naval defence of the nation. Four additional gallery spaces are used for temporary exhibits. Four museum ships – the HM Bark Endeavour Replica, the destroyer HMAS Vampire, the submarine HMAS Onslow and a replica of the Duyfken – are open to the public, while smaller historical vessels berthed outside can be viewed but not boarded.

== History ==
Of the six museums operated directly by the federal government (the Australian National Maritime Museum, the Australian War Memorial, the National Museum of Australia, the National Gallery of Australia, the National Portrait Gallery, and Questacon), the Australian National Maritime Museum is the only one located outside the Australian Capital Territory. The museum is administered by the Department of Communications and the Arts on behalf of the Australian Government.

=== Development ===
In June 1985, the federal government announced the establishment of a national museum focusing on Australia's maritime history and the nation's ongoing involvement and dependence on the sea. Proposals for the creation of such a museum had been under consideration over the preceding years. After lobbying by New South Wales Premier Neville Wran, the decision was made to situate the new museum at Darling Harbour, and construct it as part of the area's redevelopment. The building of the ANMM was seen by both the federal and New South Wales State governments as an important feature of the redevelopment, as it would be a major drawcard, and help fuel the commercial success of the precinct.

The museum building was designed by Philip Cox, Richardson Taylor & Partners. The roof was shaped to invoke the image of billowing sails: the corrugated metal roof stands over 25 metres (82 ft) tall on the west side, but drops significantly on the east.

During development, the museum ran into a series of difficulties. In March 1998, the three top members of the ANMM interim council were sacked by the federal government and replaced. Later in the year, the Department for the Arts informed the museum that its staff would be reduced by 30% and it would undergo budget cuts, forcing the Australian National Maritime Museum to rely on contracted security and conservation staff, along with volunteer guides and attendants. The acceptance of a US$5 million grant for a dedicated gallery showing the links between the US and Australia resulted in the displacement of much of the staff and research areas. Most of these were later established in the nearby Wharf 7 building.

The museum was initially slated to open in 1988, but by October that year, construction delays had pushed the planned opening date to September 1989, and the project was already $12.5 million over the $30 million budget. Construction was completed on 17 November 1989; the cost of the museum's construction had increased to $70 million, and although the federal government was willing to pay the initial $30 million, there were disagreements between the state and federal governments over who had to supply the additional $40 million. It was resolved that New South Wales was responsible for the additional funding, and in October 1990, the museum building was handed over to the federal government. The Australian National Maritime Museum was opened on 30 November 1991.

=== Operating history ===
In order to achieve commercial sustainability, the Australian National Maritime Museum was directed by the federal government to institute entry fees: the second Australian national museum to do so after Questacon was opened in 1988. The entry fee for the museum itself was dropped in 2004 (although access to the museum ships was still charged), then was re-added in December 2011.

During the museum's first ten years of operation, 3.3 million visitors attended.

In 2010, London's The Sunday Times listed the Australian National Maritime Museum in its "World's 10 Coolest Museums".

At the start of 2014, the Australian National Maritime Museum announced that it would build a pavilion to showcase exhibits related to the Royal Australian Navy. The pavilion, which is located near the museum's naval vessels, was launched on 8 November 2015 under the name "Action Stations".

In 2019, the museum underwent an extensive modernisation of its branding. Design firm Frost*collective was engaged to create a new, simplified logo and branding scheme, which was then implemented across staff uniforms, advertising, exterior building signage, websites and the museum's regular publication, Signals.

=== Directors ===
Order	Officeholder	Position title	Start date	End date	Term in office	Ref
1	Kevin Sumption	Director	2012	February 2022		
2	Daryl Karp	Director	4 July 2022	present		

== Galleries and vessels ==
=== Galleries ===
There are several permanent exhibitions at the museum, each with different themes:

Shaped by the Sea
Explores maritime deep-time history, and the connections between Indigenous Australians and the sea. At the centre of the exhibition is Dhaŋaŋ Dhukarr by the Mulka Project, a video art installation reflecting the themes of the gallery. Formerly the USA Gallery, which was the only gallery in a national museum funded by a foreign nation.
Passengers
Looks at the journeys made to Australia by various groups, from the original settlers to war brides, refugees, and cruise ship visitors.
Navy
Examines the role of the Royal Australian Navy (and before that, the Royal Navy Australian Squadron and colonial naval forces) in the defence of the nation. Notable exhibits include a working triple-expansion marine steam engine from the RAN anti-submarine net tender HMAS Kara Kara, the figurehead from Victorian colonial naval vessel HMVS Nelson, and a Fleet Air Arm Sikorsky S-70B-2 Seahawk helicopter suspended from the ceiling.
Under Southern Skies
Explores efforts to traverse and chart the waters around Australia made by various navigators throughout history, including Aboriginal Australians, Makassan traders, Polynesian seafarers and European explorers. Formerly the Navigators gallery.

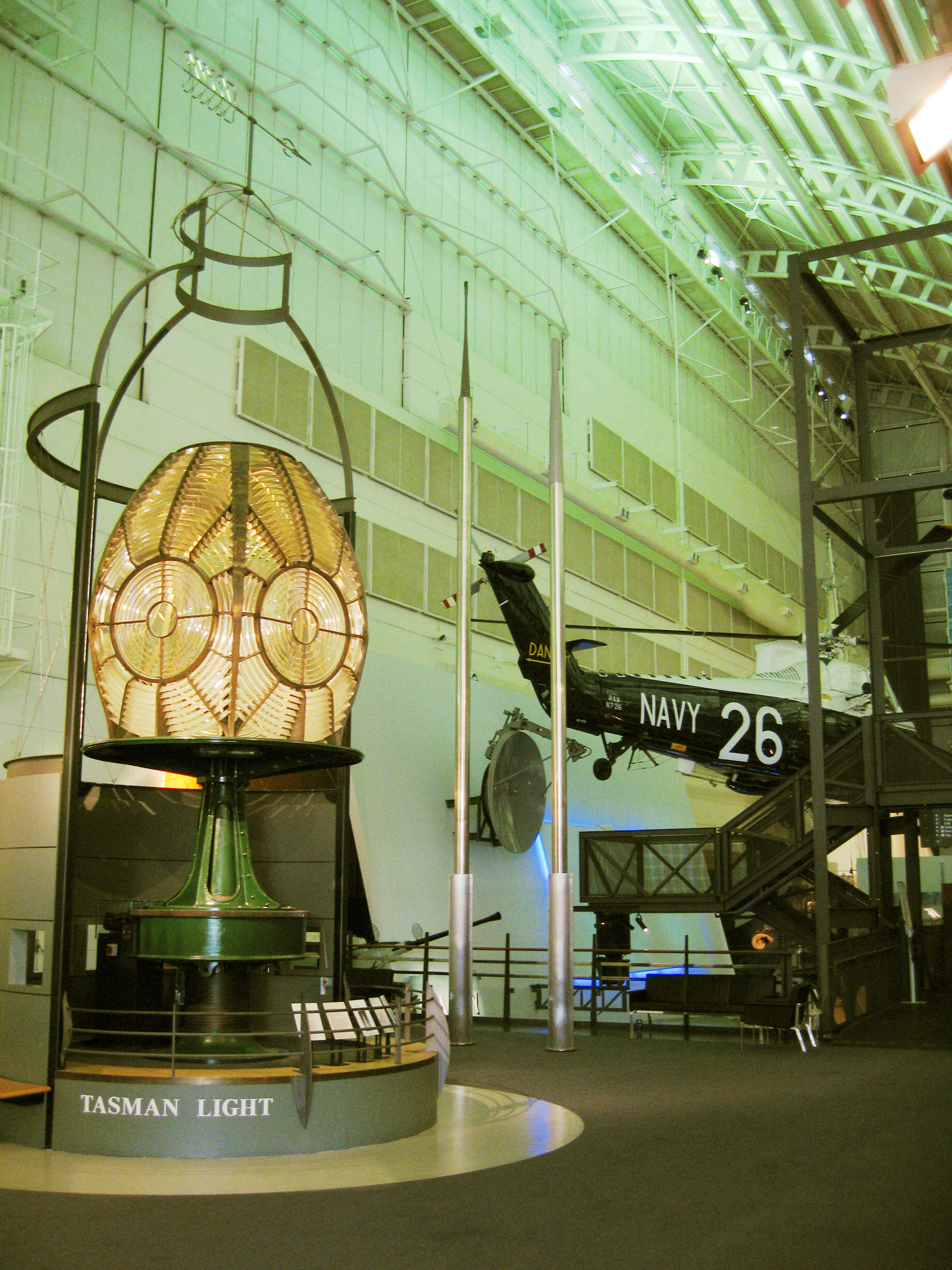
The original lenses from the Tasman Island Lighthouse; centrepiece of the Tasman Light Gallery. The Westland Wessex helicopter in the background is suspended above the Navy Gallery

In addition, there are four other gallery spaces in the museum. The Tasman Light gallery contains the original lenses from the Tasman Island Lighthouse, and is used for temporary photographic exhibitions and as hireable space for functions. The other three galleries (two along the eastern side of the top level, and a third offset from the main body of the museum) are used separately or together to host temporary exhibitions.

Several other items are on display inside the museum, but not associated with any particular gallery. These include Spirit of Australia, the water speed record-holding motorboat, an anchor from HMS Sirius, flagship of the First Fleet, and Blackmores First Lady, which was used by Australian Kay Cottee when she became the first woman to sail solo, nonstop, unassisted around the world.

=== Museum ships ===
The Australian National Maritime Museum's collection of museum ships focuses on four vessels that are open for public inspection: the HM Bark Endeavour Replica, the destroyer HMAS Vampire, the submarine HMAS Onslow and a replica of Dutch exploration vessel Duyfken. In addition, the 19th century barque James Craig is moored nearby and can be toured with a museum ticket.

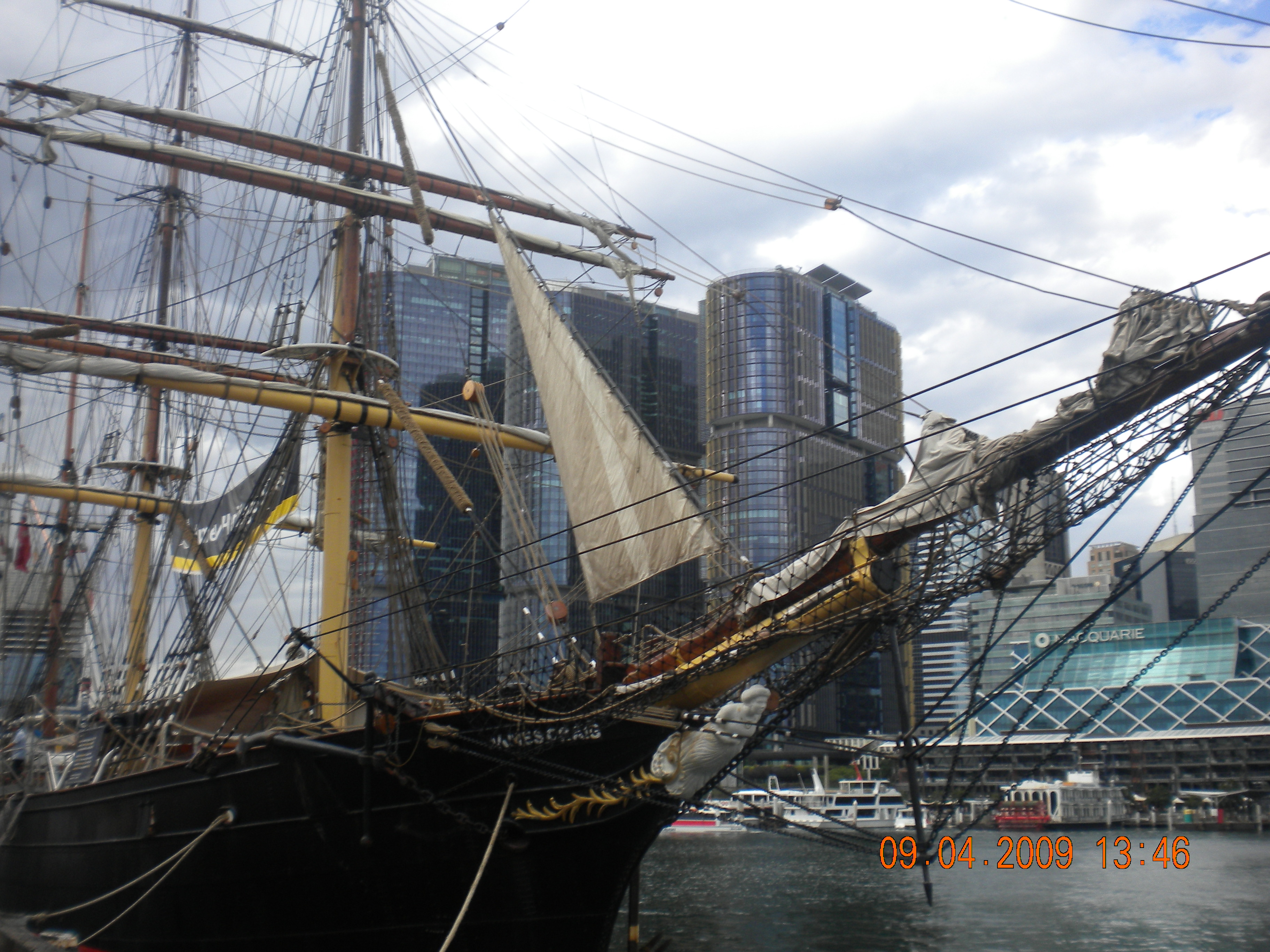
The James Craig, a 19th-century ship. It is available to tour with a museum ticket.

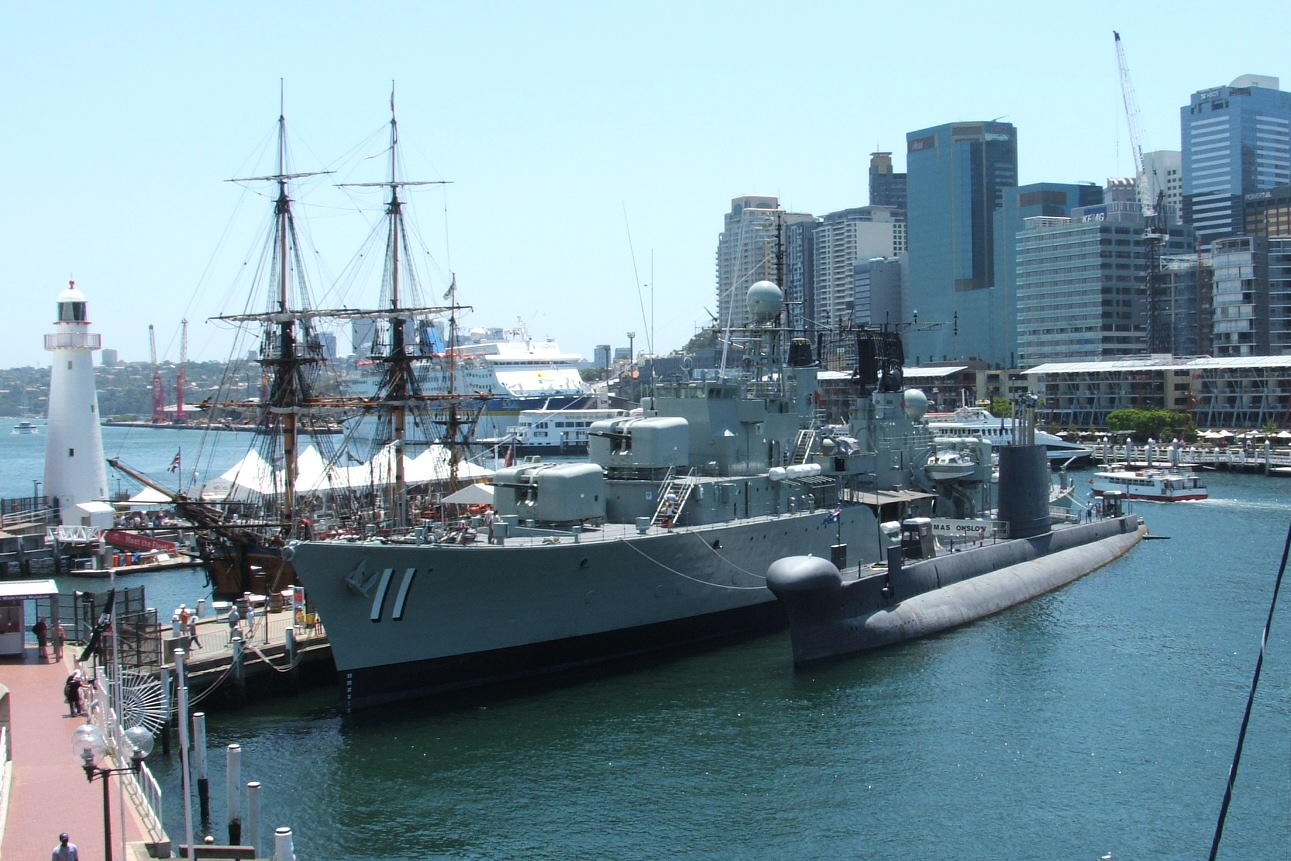
Three main vessels in the ANMM ship collection, the HM Bark Endeavour Replica, the destroyer HMAS Vampire, and the submarine HMAS Onslow, on display at the wharves outside the museum

During the mid-1980s, it was proposed that a replica of explorer James Cook's ship, HM Bark Endeavour, be constructed for the museum. Funding for construction was initially provided by the Bond Corporation, and construction began at the start of 1988. However, in 1990, the company ran into financial difficulties, and construction was unable to continue until a charitable trust was established in 1991 to complete and operate the replica Endeavour. The vessel was completed in 1994, and spent the next ten years sailing around Australia and the world before ownership was transferred to the Australian National Maritime Museum in 2005.

The Daring-class destroyer HMAS Vampire (D11) is the only ship of her class to be preserved, and was the last gun-destroyer to serve in the Royal Australian Navy. Vampire was commissioned into the RAN in 1959, and served until 1986. The destroyer was loaned to the museum on its opening in 1991, and was transferred completely to museum ownership in 1997. The Oberon-class submarine HMAS Onslow was introduced into RAN service in 1969. She was operated until early 1999, and was given to the museum that year. Despite no longer being in naval commission, Vampire and Onslow have permission to fly the Australian White Ensign. Prior to Onslow's acquisition, the former Russian submarine Foxtrot-540 was on display at the museum from 1995 to 1998. The submarine had been purchased in 1994 by a group of Australian businessmen, and was placed on display for the duration of the lease purchase contract, after which the submarine was relocated to California.

A replica of the Duyfken, a Dutch East India Company exploration vessel with historical significance as the first recorded European ship to visit Australian shores, was added to the museum's fleet in 2020. In addition to being open for public inspection, this vessel also conducts regular cruises around Sydney Harbour.

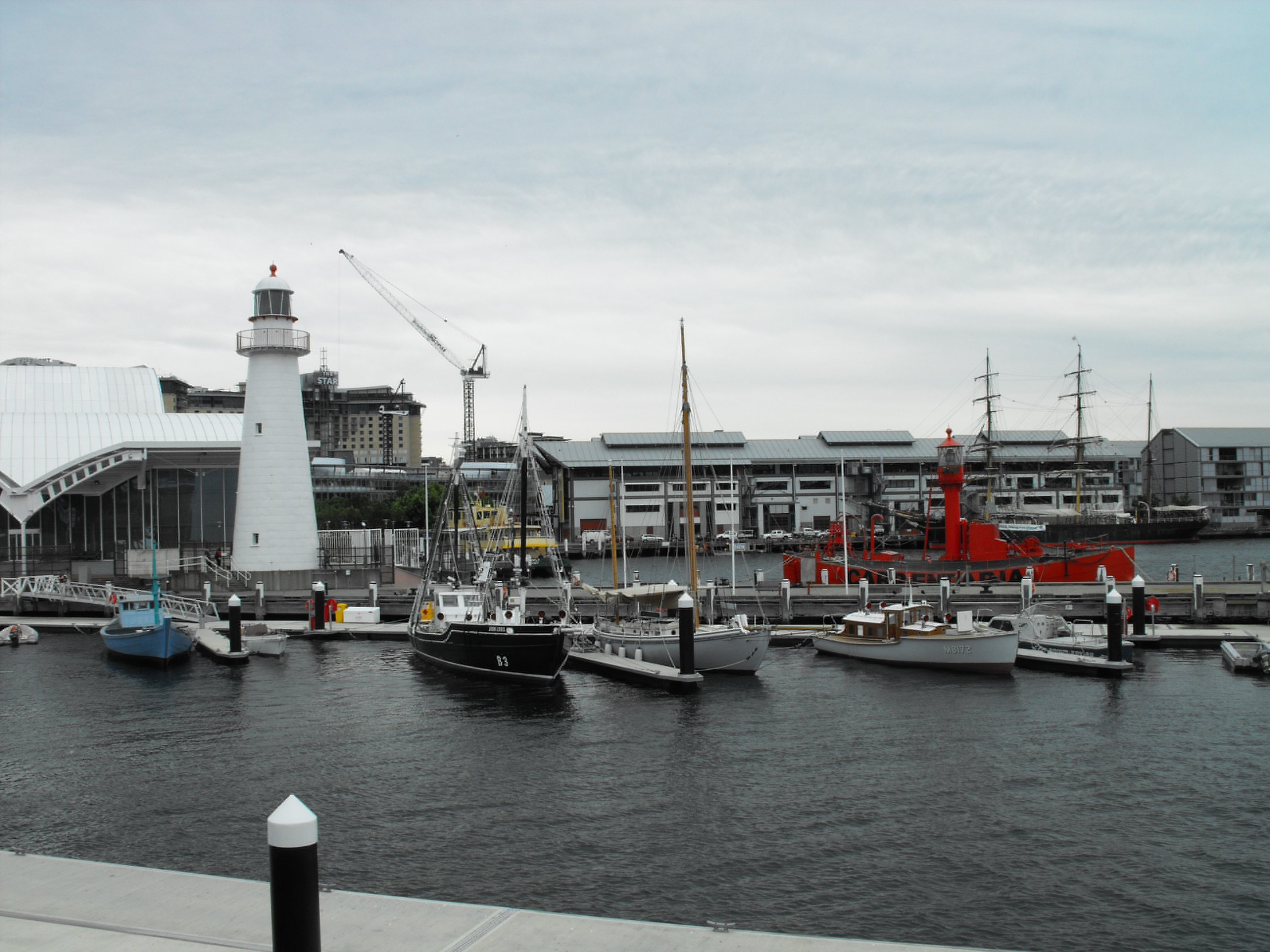
Some of the small vessels on display at the Australian National Maritime Museum. Foreground (left to right): refugee vessel Tu Do, racing yacht Akarana (without masts), pearling lugger John Lewis, ketch Kathleen Gillett, naval officer's launch MB 172, and a museum workboat. In the background are the lightvessel Carpenteria, the barque James Craig, and the original Cape Bowling Green Lighthouse.

Other vessels on display (but not open for public boarding) include:

- HMAS Advance, one of twenty Attack-class patrol boats built by the RAN during the 1960s to patrol Australia's northern waters. Advance served from 1968 until 1988, then was transferred to the Australian National Maritime Museum. The patrol boat is in operational condition.
- Akarana, a New Zealand racing yacht built to compete in Australia's centenary races, and restored as New Zealand's bicentenary gift.
- Bareki, the last timber-built tugboat in service with the NSW Maritime Services Board. The tugboat was built in 1962, and primarily used for dredging and towing work between Port Kembla and Newcastle. Bareki serves as the museum's active tugboat.
- The lightship Carpentaria, an unmanned lightvessel (effectively a floating lighthouse) built during 1916 and 1917. The vessel operated in the Gulf of Carpentaria, off Sandy Cape, Queensland, and in Bass Strait during a career which ended in 1983. In 1987, the vessel was donated to the museum collection.
- John Lewis, one of the last pearling luggers to operate in Australian waters.
- Kathleen Gillett, a double-ended ketch built for Jack Earl, an Australian sailor from designs by Colin Archer, a Norwegian man who spent time in Australia as a farmer before returning to Norway and becoming a naval architect. The yacht competed in the first Sydney to Hobart race, and was the second Australian yacht to circumnavigate the globe. The vessel ended up in Guam, was purchased by the Norwegian government in 1987, and restored as Norway's bicentennial gift.
- MV Krait, a fishing trawler used during World War II for Operation Jaywick, a commando operation to scuttle Japanese vessels in Singapore harbour. She was sold off after the war and used as a workboat for the Indonesian timber trade, but was rediscovered by Australian special forces veterans in 1962. Krait was acquired by the Australian War Memorial, then transferred on loan to the museum in 1988.
- Sekar Aman, an Indonesian perahu.
- Tu Do, a Vietnamese vessel used by 31 South Vietnamese refugees to reach Darwin in 1975, following the end of the Vietnam War. Tu Do was acquired by the museum in 1990.
- MB 172, a former officer's launch built by the RAN in 1937, and used primarily in Darwin. The vessel is active, and used to transport museum staff and guests. The vessel unofficially carries the name Epic Lass, as the launch's restoration was sponsored by Epiglass.

=== Other facilities ===
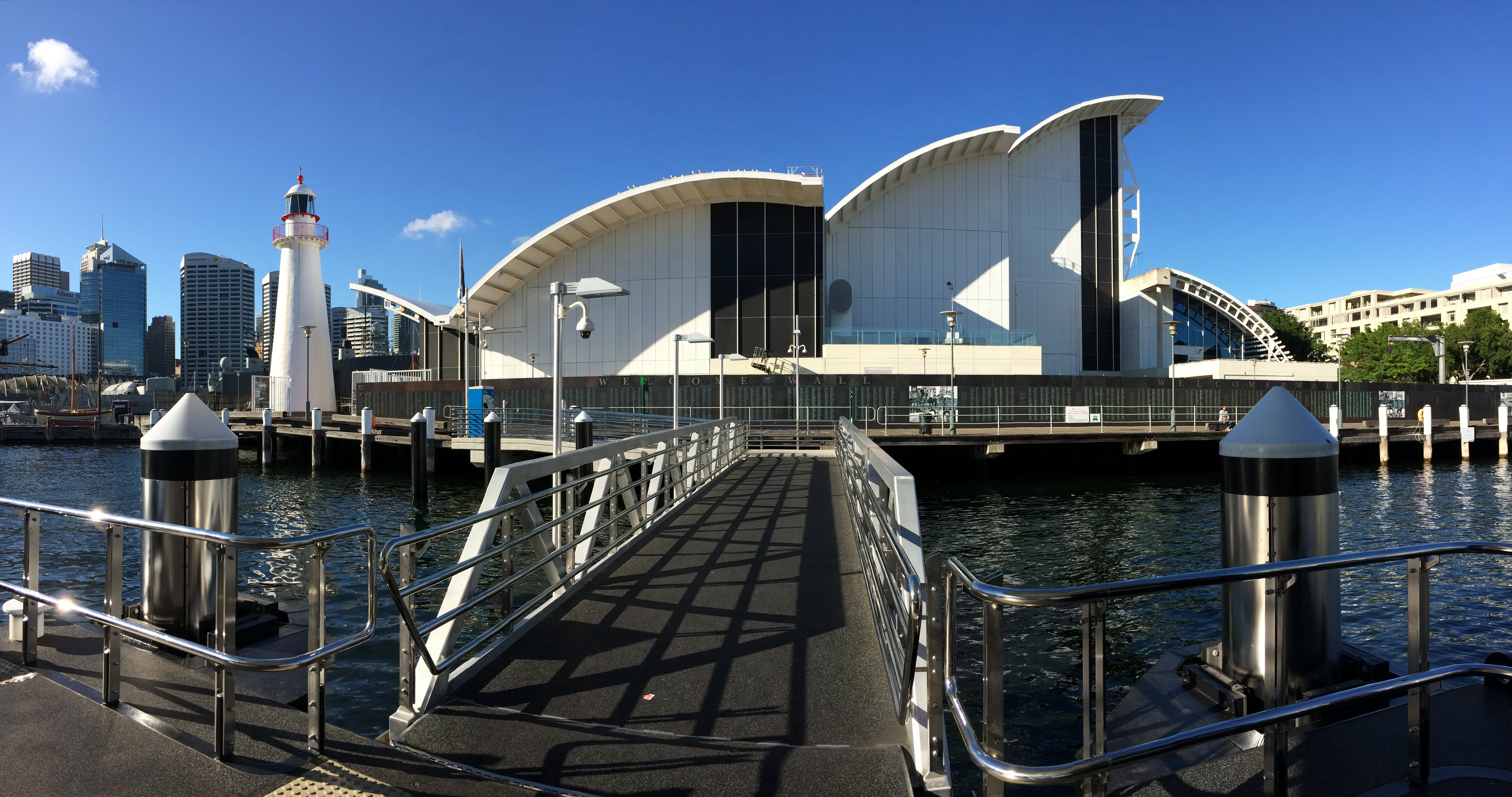
View of the museum and Cape Bowling Green Lighthouse from Pyrmont bay wharf.

The 1874-built Cape Bowling Green Lighthouse, originally located at Cape Bowling Green, near Townsville, Queensland, was relocated to the Australian National Museum site in 1987.

The Vaughan Evans Library is the research library attached to the ANMM, and is a collecting agency on maritime matters.

The Welcome Wall is a bronze wall located on the northern side of the museum, which lists the names of immigrants who arrived by sea to settle in Australia. Having a name engraved on the wall requires an application to the museum, and the paying of a fee. On 21 March 2021, Governor-General David Hurley AC DSC (Rtd) declared the Welcome Wall as Australia's "National Monument to Migration". In 2021, the wall contained more than 30,000 names.

A Harding safety lifeboat and davit is fitted on the water's edge. This lifeboat, of a design commonly used aboard offshore drilling platforms and tanker ships, is used by the Sydney Institute of TAFE for maritime training.

The Australian Maritime College conducts some postgraduate programs from the precinct.

== Other collections ==
The museum has over 1,000 Bardi performance objects known as ilma, but they were still unavailable for public viewing in 2018. The Bardi are an Australian Aboriginal people of the Dampier Peninsula in Western Australia.

== See also ==
- List of colonial vessels of New South Wales

== Sources ==
=== Books ===
- Australian Bureau of Statistics (ABS) (1991). Year Book Australia, 1991. Vol. 74. Australian Bureau of Statistics. OCLC 221660900.
- Coombes, John (2006). Tall Ships: The Sixteen Square Riggers of Australia and New Zealand. Wollombi, NSW: Exisle Publishing. ISBN 978-0-908988-84-6. OCLC 85019816.
- Gunton, George (1996). Travellers in Time: Living History in Australia. Yarram, VIC: Oceans Enterprises. ISBN 0-9586657-0-2. OCLC 38391126.
- MacMahon, Bill (2001). The architecture of East Australia: an architectural history in 432 individual presentations. Edition Axel Menges. ISBN 3-930698-90-0. OCLC 759695215.
- NSTC (1989). National Science and Technology Centre Report of Activities 1988–89. Canberra: Commonwealth of Australia. ISBN 0-644-10772-3.
- Shaw, Lindsey (2005). HMAS Onslow: cold war warrior. Sydney, NSW: Australian National Maritime Museum. ISBN 0-9751428-4-4. OCLC 225390609.
- Shaw, Lindsey (2007). HMAS Vampire: Last of the big guns (2nd ed.). Sydney, NSW: Australian National Maritime Museum. ISBN 978-0-642-51867-5. OCLC 271312410.
- Witcomb, Andrea (2004). Re-Imagining the Museum: Beyond the Mausoleum. Museum Meanings. Routledge. ISBN 0-203-36102-4. OCLC 50166657.

=== News and journal articles ===
- Casey, Annie (3 May 1999). "Onslow finds new home". Navy News. Archived from the original on 11 November 2012.
- Cornford, Phillip (5 February 2000). "Cottee sells First Lady to museum". The Sydney Morning Herald. p. 15.
- "Go west: Australia II heads for home". The Sydney Morning Herald. 27 October 2000. p. 3.
- Hundley, Paul (September 2010). "USA Gallery Revisited". Signals (92). Australian National Maritime Museum: 45–8.
- Meacham, Steve (3 December 2001). "How the museum boss got engaged". The Sydney Morning Herald. p. 14.
- Meacham, Steve (16 November 2011). "Museum sets a course for the future". The Sydney Morning Herald. Archived from the original on 18 November 2011.
- Mendelssohn, Joanna (15 October 1999). "Maritime Museum has that sinking feeling". The Sydney Morning Herald. p. 13.
- O'Brien, Geraldine (3 October 1990). "Finally, smooth sailing for museum". The Sydney Morning Herald. p. 5.
- Totaro, Paola (29 November 1989). "Museum no-one wants to pay for". The Sydney Morning Herald. p. 14.
- Walsh, Don (April 1998). "Soviet sub penetrates Sydney Harbour!". Proceedings. 124 (4). United States Naval Institute: 105.
