= Kay Cottee =

Australian sailor (born 1954)

Kay Cottee AO
- Born: Kay McLaren; 25 January 1954 (age 72); Sydney, New South Wales, Australia
- Citizenship: Australian
- Occupations: Yachtswoman; motivational speaker; boatbuilder; business executive; author; artist
- Spouses: Neville Cottee (m. 1972–1981) Peter Sutton (m. 1989)
- Children: 1

Kay Cottee AO (née McLaren, born 25 January 1954) is an Australian sailor, who was the first woman to perform a single-handed, non-stop and unassisted circumnavigation of the world. She performed this feat in 1988 in her 37 feet (11 m) yacht Blackmores First Lady, taking 189 days.

== Personal life ==
Born Kay McLaren, the youngest of four daughters, in Sydney on 25 January 1954, Cottee grew up in the southern Sydney suburb of Sans Souci. She was born into a yachting family and was taken sailing for the first time when only a few weeks old. For secondary schooling, she attended Moorefield Girls High School in Kogarah, New South Wales.

Over the next nine years Cottee moved to Pittwater where she built a yacht and established a bareboat charter business.

Cottee now lives in Yamba on the far NSW north coast with television producer husband Peter Sutton. She is an international motivational speaker, boat builder, writer, painter and sculptor.

== Solo circumnavigation ==
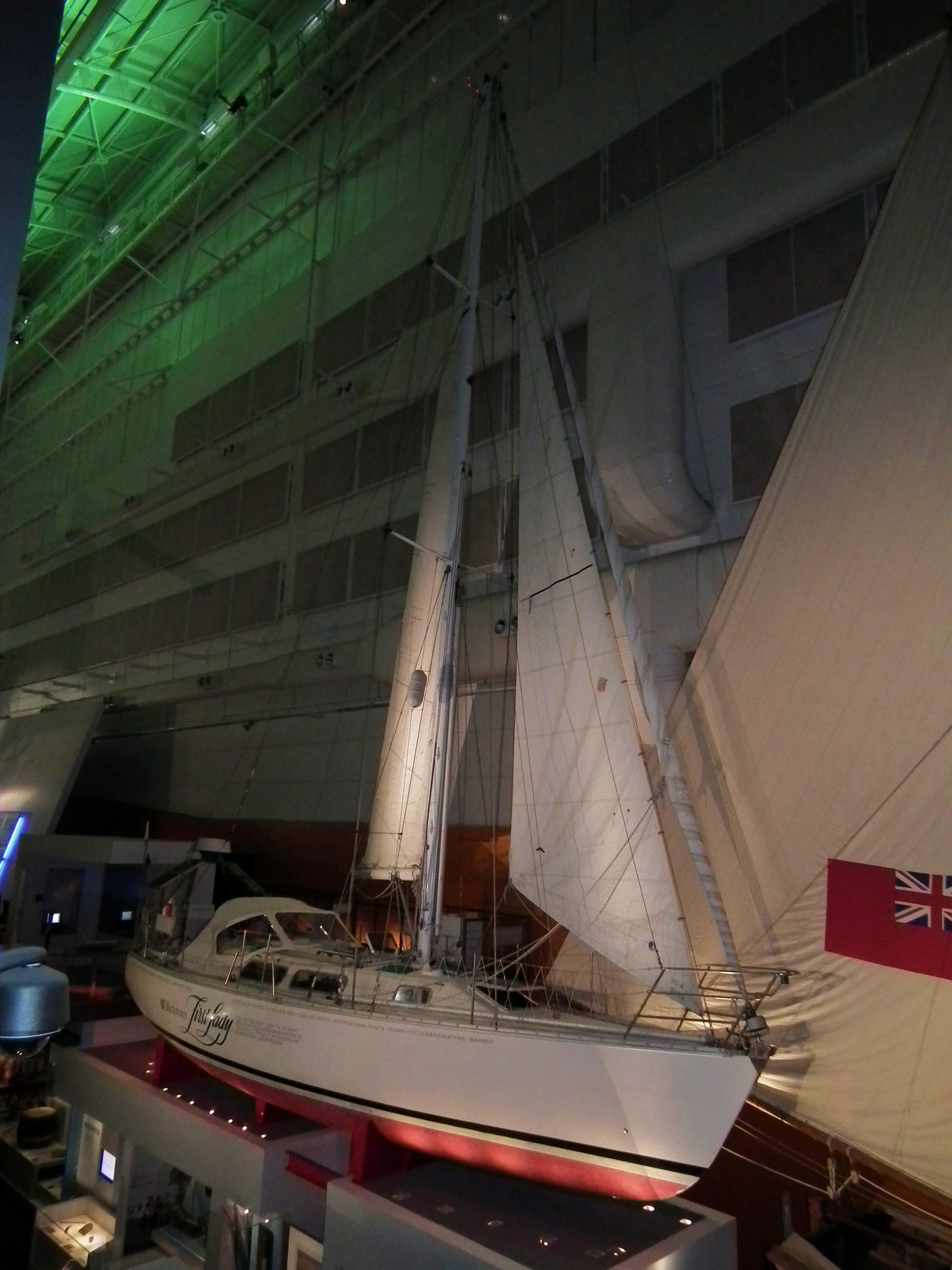
The yacht Blackmores First Lady

On 5 June 1988 at age 34, Cottee became the first woman to sail round the world alone non-stop and unassisted when she sailed through the heads of Sydney harbour. She was greeted by tens of thousands of well-wishers. Cottee had left the harbour 189 days earlier, on 29 November 1987.

The historic voyage on her 37 ft yacht Blackmores First Lady was also the fastest sailing trip around the world by a woman and the first solo, non-stop and unassisted voyage around the world by a woman.

In the Southern Ocean, Cottee's boat was knocked down continuously and she was washed overboard. When Cottee rounded Cape Horn, the southernmost tip of South America, she celebrated with a lunch of crab, mayonnaise and self baked bread, and a bottle of Grange, a prestigious Australian wine.

Cottee and her major sponsor Blackmores Limited used the voyage to raise over $1M for the Rev. Ted Noffs' Life Education Program. Cottee also undertook an 18-month national schools tour, speaking to over 40,000 senior high school students, imparting the message you can achieve your dreams if you work steadily towards them.

== Yacht building ==
In 2002 Cottee designed and built the first Kay Cottee 56, a fibreglass/foam sandwich construction yacht designed as a bluewater cruiser. With husband Peter Sutton, Cottee set up a boat building business near Yamba on the north coast of NSW in order to produce the yachts, each one which would take an anticipated 8 months to build.

== Awards ==
Since her round the world trip, Kay Cottee has received numerous accolades.

- In 1988, Cottee received the Australian of the Year Award.
- In January 1989, Cottee was appointed an Officer of the Order of Australia.
- Inductee of the Victorian Honour Roll of Women in 2001.
- Cottee is also the first Australian recipient of the Cutty Sark Medal presented by Prince Philip, Duke of Edinburgh.
- Cottee was also made a Paul Harris Fellow by Rotary and an International Honorary Zontion by Zonta International
- Inaugural inductee of the Australian Sailing Hall of Fame in 2017

== Other achievements ==
=== Australian National Maritime Museum ===
In 1991, Cottee joined the advisory board of the Australian National Maritime Museum. She was chair of the museum from 1995 until 2001. In 2000, Blackmores First Lady, was acquired by the museum and placed on permanent display.

=== Publications ===
Cottee is the author of two books. Her first book, First Lady, was published by Macmillan in 1989. Her second book, All at Sea on Land, was published by Pan Macmillan in 1998, about her life in the ten years since the voyage.
