= HMAS Onslow =

Royal Australian Navy submarine (1969–1999)

Coordinates: 33°52.155′S 151°11.997′E

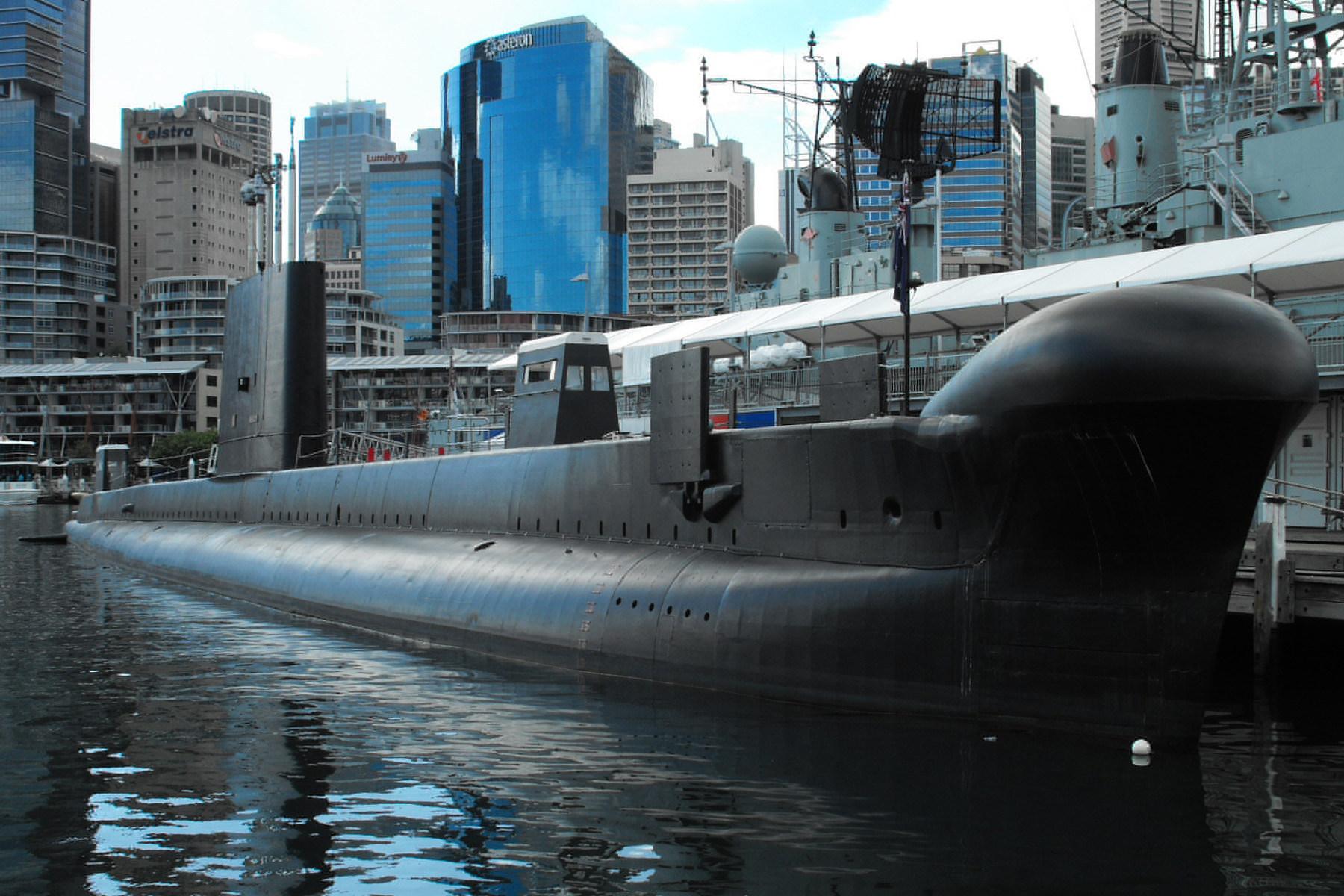
- HMAS Onslow on display at the Australian National Maritime Museum

History

Australia
- Namesake: Town of Onslow, Western Australia
- Ordered: 1963
- Builder: Scotts Shipbuilding & Engineering Company, Greenock
- Laid down: 4 December 1967
- Launched: 3 December 1968
- Commissioned: 22 December 1969
- Decommissioned: 29 March 1999
- Refit: Modernisation (1982–1984)
- Home port: HMAS Platypus Sydney
- Motto: Festina Lente ("Hasten Slowly")
- Status: Museum ship at the Australian National Maritime Museum since April 1999

General characteristics
- Class & type: Oberon-class submarine
- Displacement: 1,610 tons standard; 2,030 tons surfaced; 2,410 tons submerged
- Length: 295.2 ft (90.0 m)
- Beam: 26.5 ft (8.1 m)
- Draught: 18 ft (5.5 m)
- Propulsion: 2 × Admiralty Standard Range supercharged V16 diesel generators; 2 × English Electric motors; 3,500 bhp, 4,500 shp; 2 shafts
- Speed: 12 knots (22 km/h; 14 mph) surfaced; 17 knots (31 km/h; 20 mph) submerged; 11 knots (20 km/h; 13 mph) at snorkel depth
- Range: 9,000 nautical miles (17,000 km; 10,000 mi) at 12 knots (22 km/h; 14 mph)
- Test depth: 200 metres (660 ft)
- Complement: As launched: 8 officers, 56 sailors; At decommissioning: 8 officers, 60 sailors
- Sensors & processing systems: Sonar: Atlas Elektronik Type CSU3-41 bow array; BAC Type 2007 flank array; Sperry BQG-4 Micropuffs rangefinding array; Radar: Kelvin Hughes Type 1006
- Armament: Torpedo tubes: 6 × 21-inch (53 cm) bow tubes; 2 × short-length 21-inch (53 cm) stern tubes (later removed); Payload: Mix of 20: Mark 48 Mod 4 torpedoes; UGM-84 Sub Harpoon missiles
- Notes: Taken from:

HMAS Onslow (SS 60/SSG 60) is one of six Oberon-class submarines, previously operated by the Royal Australian Navy (RAN). The submarine was named after the town of Onslow, Western Australia, and Sir Alexander Onslow, with the boat's motto and badge derived from Onslow's family heritage. Ordered in 1963, Onslow was laid down at the end of 1967 by Scotts Shipbuilding & Engineering Company in Scotland, launched almost a year later, and commissioned into the RAN at the end of 1969.

During her career, Onslow became the first conventionally powered submarine to be fitted with anti-ship missiles, and was successful in wargames, "sinking" a seven-ship flotilla during Exercise Kangaroo 3 in 1980 and the United States supercarrier USS Carl Vinson at RIMPAC 1998.

After being decommissioned in March 1999, Onslow was then presented to the Australian National Maritime Museum in April, where she is preserved as a museum ship.

== Design and construction ==
Onslow is one of four Oberon-class submarines ordered in 1963. The last of this group, Onslow was laid down by Scotts Shipbuilding & Engineering Co. in Greenock, Scotland on 4 December 1967. She was launched by Princess Alexandra, The Honourable Lady Ogilvy on 3 December 1968, and commissioned into the RAN on 22 December 1969. The boat was named after the coastal town of Onslow, Western Australia, which was in turn named after Sir Alexander Onslow, the third Chief Justice of Western Australia. Onslow's motto, Festina Lente (Latin for "Hasten Slowly"), is shared with the Onslow family, and the ship's badge contains a judge's wig. Although this was the only use of the name by the RAN, two surface ships of the Royal Navy have previously been named HMS Onslow.

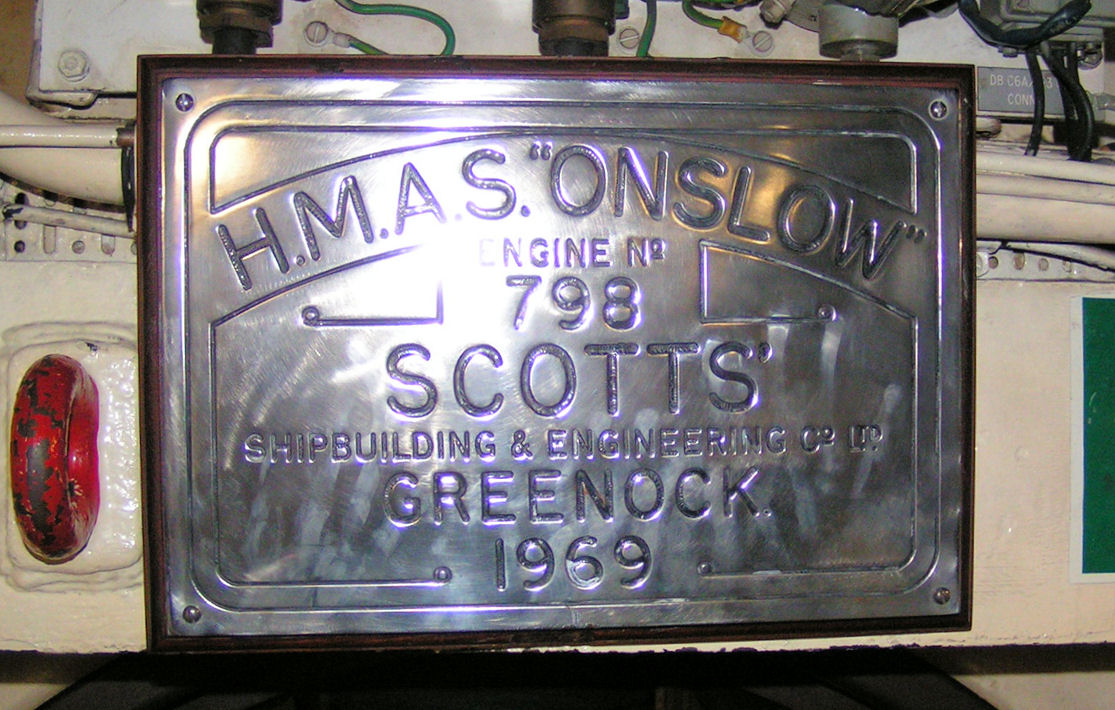
The builders' plaque for Onslow

The submarine is 295.2 feet (90.0 m) long, with a beam of 26.5 feet (8.1 m), and a draught of 18 feet (5.5 m) when surfaced. At full load displacement, Onslow displaces 2,030 tons when surfaced, and 2,410 tons when submerged. The two propeller shafts are each driven by an English Electric motor providing 3,500 brake horsepower and 4,500 shaft horsepower; the electricity for these is generated by two Admiralty Standard Range supercharged V16 diesel generators. These can propel the submarine at up to 12 knots (22 km/h; 14 mph) on the surface, and up to 17 knots (31 km/h; 20 mph) when submerged. Onslow has a maximum range of 9,000 nautical miles (17,000 km; 10,000 mi) at 12 knots (22 km/h; 14 mph), and a test depth of 200 metres (660 ft) below sea level. When launched, the boat had a company of 8 officers and 56 sailors, but by the time she was decommissioned, the number of sailors had increased to 60. In addition, up to 16 trainees could be carried.

Unlike other submarines in her class, Onslow is fitted with a four-man diver access hatch, allowing for easier deployment and recovery of special forces divers.

=== Armament ===
The main armament of Onslow are six 21-inch (53 cm) bow torpedo tubes, capable of firing torpedoes or releasing sea mines. The British Mark 8 torpedo was initially carried by the submarine; this was replaced by the wire-guided Mark 23. During a refit from 1982 to 1984, Oberon became the first conventionally-powered submarine in the world to be fitted with anti-ship missiles—specifically, the UGM-84 Sub Harpoon. At the same time, the Mark 23 torpedoes were replaced by the United States Mark 48 wire-guided torpedo. As of 1996, the standard payload of Onslow was a mix of 20 Mark 48 Mod 4 torpedoes and Sub Harpoon missiles. Some or all of the torpedo payload could be replaced by Mark 5 Stonefish sea mines, which were deployed through the torpedo tubes.

The submarine's secondary armament consisted of two stern-mounted, short-length 21-inch (53 cm) torpedo tubes: these were intended for use against pursuing submarines, but the development of steerable wire-guided torpedoes shortly after the boat entered service made these redundant, and they were closed off during the 1982–84 refit. The aft tubes fired Mark 20 anti-submarine torpedoes.

== Operational history ==
=== 1970–1981 ===
Onslow arrived in Sydney at the conclusion of her delivery voyage to Australia on 4 July 1970. On board was Vice Admiral Sir Victor Smith, at the time the Chief of Naval Staff, who had embarked at Brisbane. The boat visited Pearl Harbor later that year; arriving without being detected by the USN until she surfaced in the middle of the harbour. Onslow returned to Pearl Harbor in 1971 to participate in the RIMPAC multinational naval exercise. During the exercise, a practice torpedo fired by the United States Coast Guard Cutter Rush failed to disengage as designed and hit the submarine—the damage was a small dent near the stern and a crack in the port propeller shaft seal causing flooding in the after ends. Submarine went to emergency stations, all water tight hatches sealed and Salvage blow was started to the flooding compartment which had four crew inside (Tony, Ned, Gra, and Mal) Onslow was not permitted to dive again until damage was inspected via dry-dock back in Australia after a six week wait in Pearl Harbour for a local docking that failed to eventuate.

Onslow became the first vessel of the RAN to be assigned to the ANZUK force in Singapore on 22 July 1972. During another ANZUK deployment, in 1974, the boat's attack periscope was damaged when it came in contact with the log probe of the frigate HMS Leopard. The boat returned to Australia on 18 December. On 5 May 1975, Onslow began a two-year refit at Cockatoo Island Dockyard, becoming the first Australian submarine to use the dockyard's new slave dock. This dock had been built specifically for refit work on Oberon-class submarines, and was the main location of all Onslow's refits until 1990. In 1977, Onslow was presented with the Gloucester Cup, marking her as the most efficient warship in the RAN during the previous year—Onslow was the first submarine to receive the award.

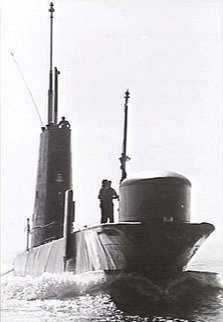
Onslow underway on the surface. A sailor is standing near the original bow sonar dome. This dome was replaced during the submarine's 1982–84 refit, as the new sonar was larger.

In 1980, Onslow participated in Exercise Kangaroo 3 as an opposing submarine. During the exercise, Onslow carried out successful simulated attacks on all seven surface ships involved in the exercise without being 'sunk' herself, including a simultaneous 'attack' on two United States Navy (USN) amphibious warfare vessels and a RAN replenishment ship while they were under escort by the other four warships. To indicate her success, the submarine flew a Jolly Roger from her communications mast upon her return to port, which was marked with the silhouettes of her seven targets: the Perth-class destroyers HMAS Brisbane and HMAS Hobart, the Knox-class frigate USS Lang, the River-class destroyer escort HMAS Yarra, the Anchorage-class dock landing ship USS Mount Vernon, the Newport-class tank landing ship USS Bristol County, and the Tide-class replenishment oiler HMAS Supply.

On 1 March 1981, Onslow participated in wargames with a Royal New Zealand Navy frigate off the coast of Sydney. While operating at periscope depth, the submarine spotted an 'enemy' P-3C Orion aircraft and stopped snorting (the process of taking in air to operate the boat's two diesel generators and expelling the produced exhaust through a snorkel) in preparation to go deep. Both generators were turned off, but upon diving, it was quickly discovered that the starboard diesel had failed to switch off or had restarted and as the exhaust snorkel was sealed, the carbon monoxide exhaust filled the submarine. Onslow rapidly resurfaced, and the exhaust was pumped from the submarine. Able Seaman Christopher Passlow, who had been on the lower deck of the submarine at the time, died of asphyxiation and carbon monoxide poisoning, while another eighteen were rendered unconscious or were convulsing because of blood poisoning. Upon returning to base, doctors found that one-third of the 66 survivors had absorbed twice the lethal limit of carbon monoxide into their blood. The crew onboard were taken to Soldiers Beach surf club and provided with free alcohol for 3 days before returning back to duties. They were not compensated in any other way as stated they were by the RAN.

The RAN Board of Inquiry into the incident concluded that the accident was caused by human error—the duty engineer failed to shut down both engines—but members of Onslow's complement disagree with this, claiming the problem to be mechanical in origin. Changes were made to Submarine Service operating procedures as a result of the Inquiry, but the investigation and subsequent report remained classified until 2009, when the information was acquired by the Sunday Night newsmagazine program under the Freedom of Information Act. When interviewed by Sunday Night in March 2009, the deputy Chief of Navy, Rear Admiral Davyd Thomas (who had been Passlow's divisional officer prior to the incident) promised counselling for the survivors, and claimed that prior treatment of the Onslow submariners was due to a limited understanding of post-traumatic stress disorder back in the 1980s.

=== 1982–1990 ===
Onslow underwent a modernisation refit from 1982 until 1984, becoming the third Australian Oberon to be modernised. As part of the modernisation, integrated data processing and fire control systems were installed, and the boat was fitted with Micropuffs passive ranging sonar. The torpedo payload was upgraded to the United States Mark 48 wire-guided torpedo. In addition to new torpedoes, the modernisation allowed Oberon-class submarines to carry and fire the Harpoon anti-ship missile through the torpedo tubes: Onslow became the first conventionally-powered submarine in the world to be fitted with guided anti-ship missiles.

Onslow was the first Australian submarine to visit the west coast of the United States of America when she arrived in San Diego on 17 July 1985. The boat made goodwill visits to the cities of San Francisco and Seattle during mid-August, before participating in the Royal Fleet Review for the 75th anniversary of the Royal Canadian Navy.

Onslow's "safe to dive" certificate ran out just after Christmas 1989. The Australian government had been trialling a program whereby refit work was tendered out to the private sector; delays in selecting the winning company and allocating the funds meant that an 18-month refit of the submarine scheduled to begin at the start of 1990 did not commence on time. Australian Defence Industries (ADI) was awarded the $100 million refit contract for Onslow and sister submarine HMAS Otama in July. Cockatoo Island's slave dock was transferred to the ADI facilities at Garden Island in November 1990, and was used for the refit. It was later found, during arbitration between the Australian Government and Cockatoo Island Dockyard for various issues, that by tendering out the submarine refits to other companies, the government was in breach of contract with the Dockyard; A$17.3 million in compensation was awarded to the dockyard in August 1996 for loss of profits and overhead costs.

=== 1990–1999 ===
In the early 1990s, four of Onslow's sister boats were decommissioned from service. By 1996, Onslow and Otama were the only members of the class in active service.

During 1995, Onslow was deployed to South East Asia. During this deployment, the personnel of Onslow were involved in a controversial line-crossing ceremony while operating near the equator. During this particular ceremony, normally intended to induct new sailors into the "court of King Neptune", the victims were verbally and physically abused, had their pelvises and genitals covered in what was described as a "blistering concoction", then thrown overboard and forced to stay there until the rest of the company permitted them on board. When one of the victimised sailors complained to superiors, he became subject to several administrative errors and inconveniences, to the point where he was forced to resign a year later. The sailor acquired a copy of a videotape made of the ceremony and presented it to the Nine Network, which broke the story on 6 July 1999. An inquiry into the incident aboard Onslow was held, which found that although guidelines had been developed in the years after the incident to prevent harassment in the Australian Defence Force, disciplinary charges against the sailors involved could not be laid, as more than three years had passed since the offence. The inquiry also stated that while line-crossing ceremonies would continue to be held aboard RAN vessels, they would be supervised by a non-involved member of the crew to prevent similar extreme situations developing. The deployment ended in December, with Onslow visiting her namesake town for the last time on her return to Australia.

On the evening of 16 April 1997, three Australian Special Air Service Regiment soldiers were injured when they were thrown from their Zodiac boat during launch and recovery exercises with the submarine. Later that year, in November, Onslow participated in a joint RAN-RAAF exercise off the coast of Western Australia. Over the end of 1997 and the start of 1998, Onslow and Otama were used for trials of the Australian-designed Narama towed array sonar. The Narama sonar was one of the towed arrays under consideration for incorporation with the under-development Collins-class submarines, and was the array selected.

In mid-1998, the date of Onslow's decommissioning was announced for early 1999. Representatives from the town of Onslow, Western Australia requested that the submarine visit her namesake town before decommissioning, but were informed that the submarine's planned operational schedule could not accommodate such a visit. As part of this schedule, Onslow participated in the 1998 RIMPAC exercise. The submarine had to pull out of the early part of the exercise: a resistor in the motor room switchboard had begun to smoke, forcing Onslow to return to Pearl Harbor for repairs. She departed on 12 July, but was forced to return less than 24 hours later when a smouldering smell was noticed. During the latter part of RIMPAC 98, on the morning of 10 August, Onslow located the "enemy" Nimitz-class USS Carl Vinson, closed to within 300 metres (980 ft) without being detected, then released green flares to indicate her location, "sinking" the supercarrier. From 7 November onwards, Onslow was used as the target submarine for the annual Fincastle competition. Onslow operated on a secret patrol course 130 nautical miles (240 km; 150 mi) south of Kangaroo Island while aircraft from the competing Australian, British, Canadian, and New Zealand air forces attempted to locate and "sink" her. No. 5 Squadron RNZAF was declared the winner, although all teams were successful in locating the submarine during at least one of their three attempts.

== Decommissioning and preservation ==
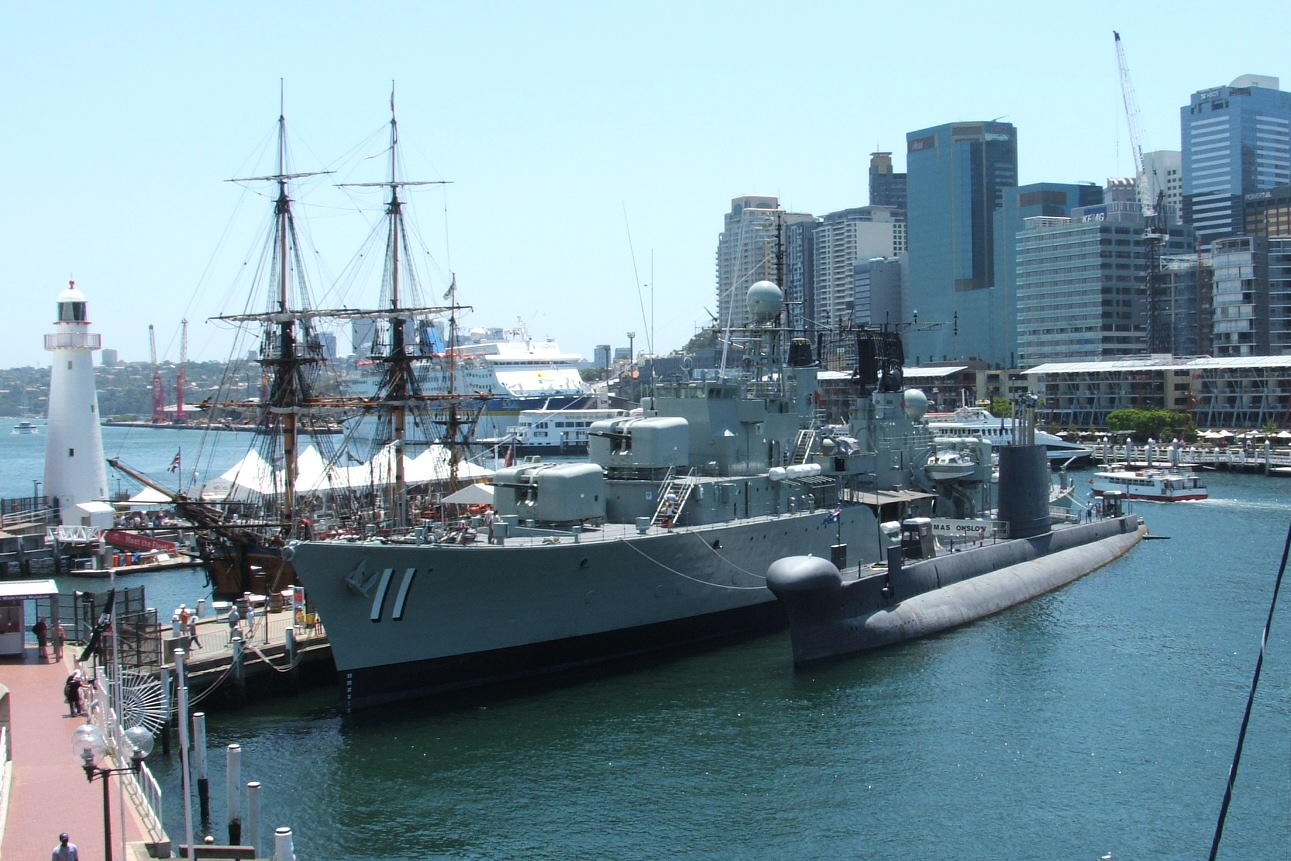
Onslow at the Australian National Maritime Museum, alongside the destroyer HMAS Vampire and the HM Bark Endeavour replica

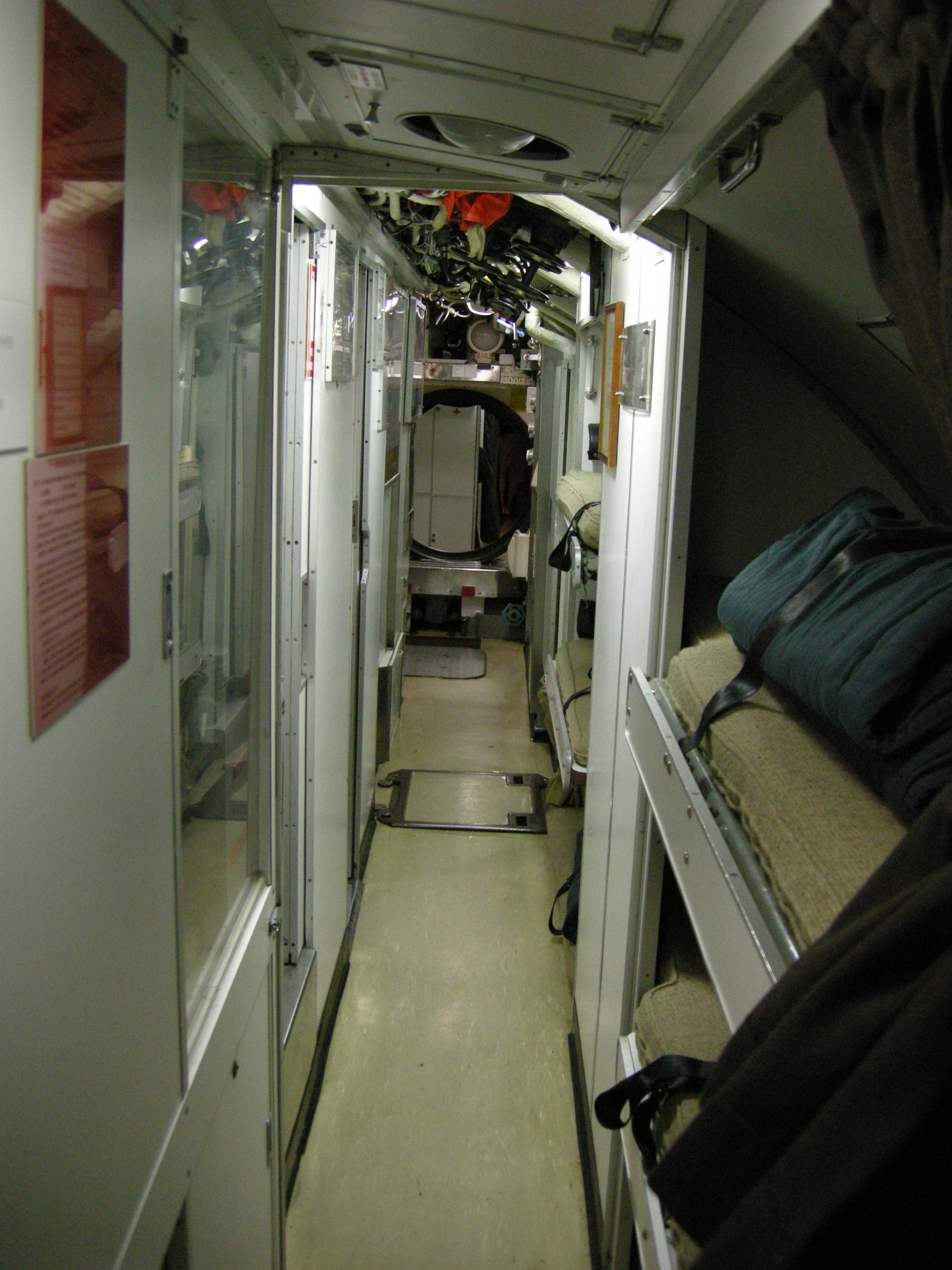
Bunks onboard HMAS Onslow

Onslow was decommissioned from service on 30 March 1999. While in service, Onslow travelled 358,068 nautical miles (663,142 km; 412,057 mi). On the same day, sister boat Otama was permanently reassigned to the submarine base at HMAS Stirling in Western Australia, clearing the way for the closure of HMAS Platypus.

The submarine was gifted to the Australian National Maritime Museum in April 1999. On 3 May 1999, the submarine was towed from Platypus to the museum at Darling Harbour. Onslow was docked next to HMAS Vampire, another warship belonging to the museum, and was officially opened to the public on 1 June 1999. Onslow is the second RAN submarine to be preserved as a museum ship; the first was sister submarine HMAS Ovens, which was decommissioned at the end of 1998 and installed at the WA Maritime Museum. As of 2004, she is one of seven Oberon-class submarines preserved in this manner.

On 22 November 2002, Onslow was taken by tugs to Garden Island for three weeks of maintenance in drydock. This included cleaning and repainting of the hull, replacement of the tributyltin coating used to prevent biofouling with a coating that was not harmful to marine organisms, and the sealing of several ballast tanks to improve the boat's stability and raise the aft section relative to the waterline. Onslow was returned to the museum on 11 December, and re-opened to the public three days later. In October and November 2008, Onslow returned to Garden Island for maintenance and upkeep. During this refit, an additional torpedo was loaded into the submarine's torpedo tubes and her hull was cleaned and painted. Another docking occurred on 18 May 2012, with hull cleaning, rust removal, repainting, and repairs to the boat's aft torpedo tubes done before she returned to display on 6 June. In November 2015, the submarine was moved to the new Warships Pavilion 'Action Stations' at the Australian National Maritime Museum alongside HMAS Vampire (D11) and HMAS Advance. In February 2018 Onslow was towed from the museum to Garden Island, Sydney, for regular maintenance in dry dock.

== Gallery ==
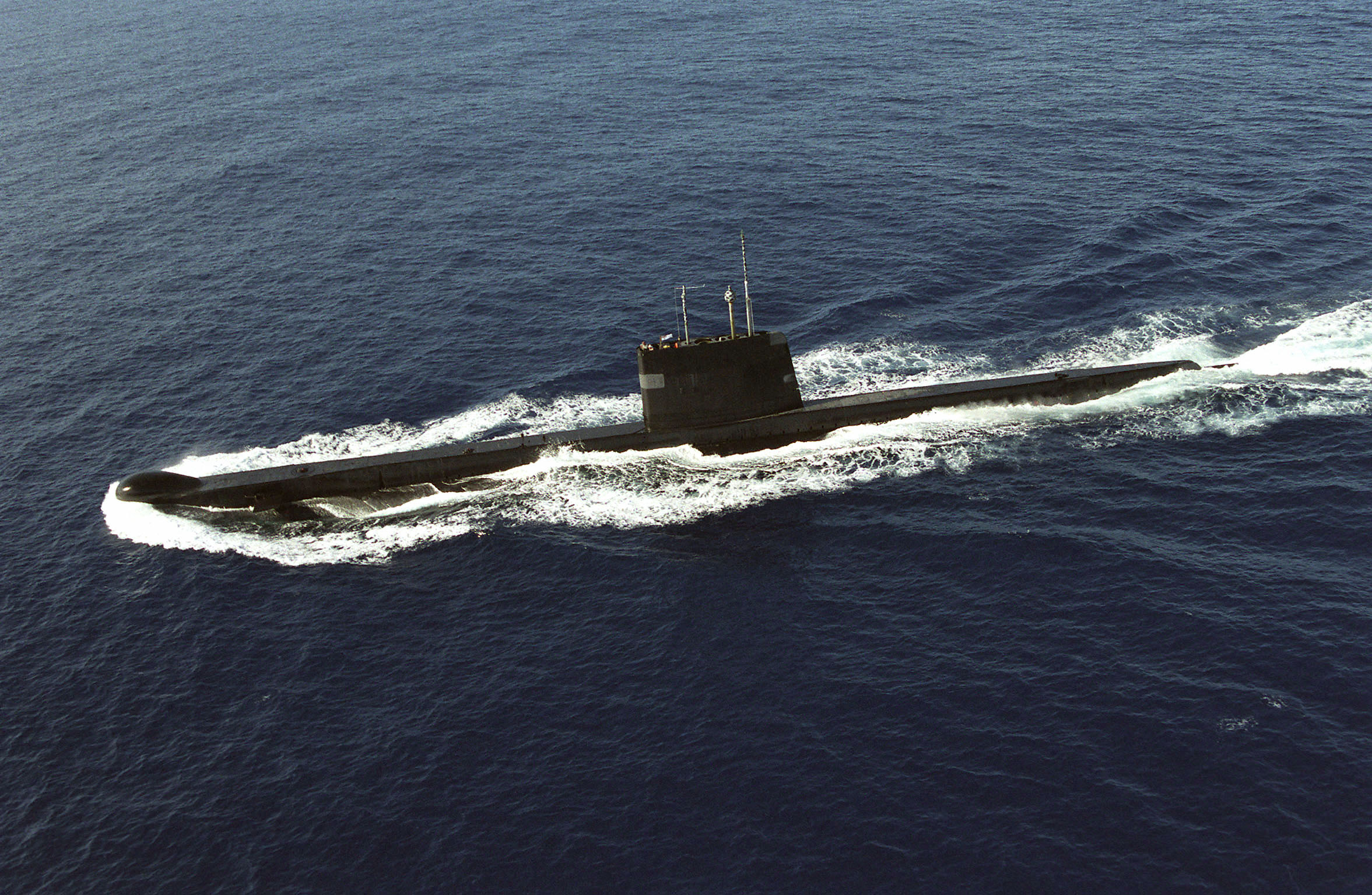
HMAS Onslow returning to Hawaii from RIMPAC 98.

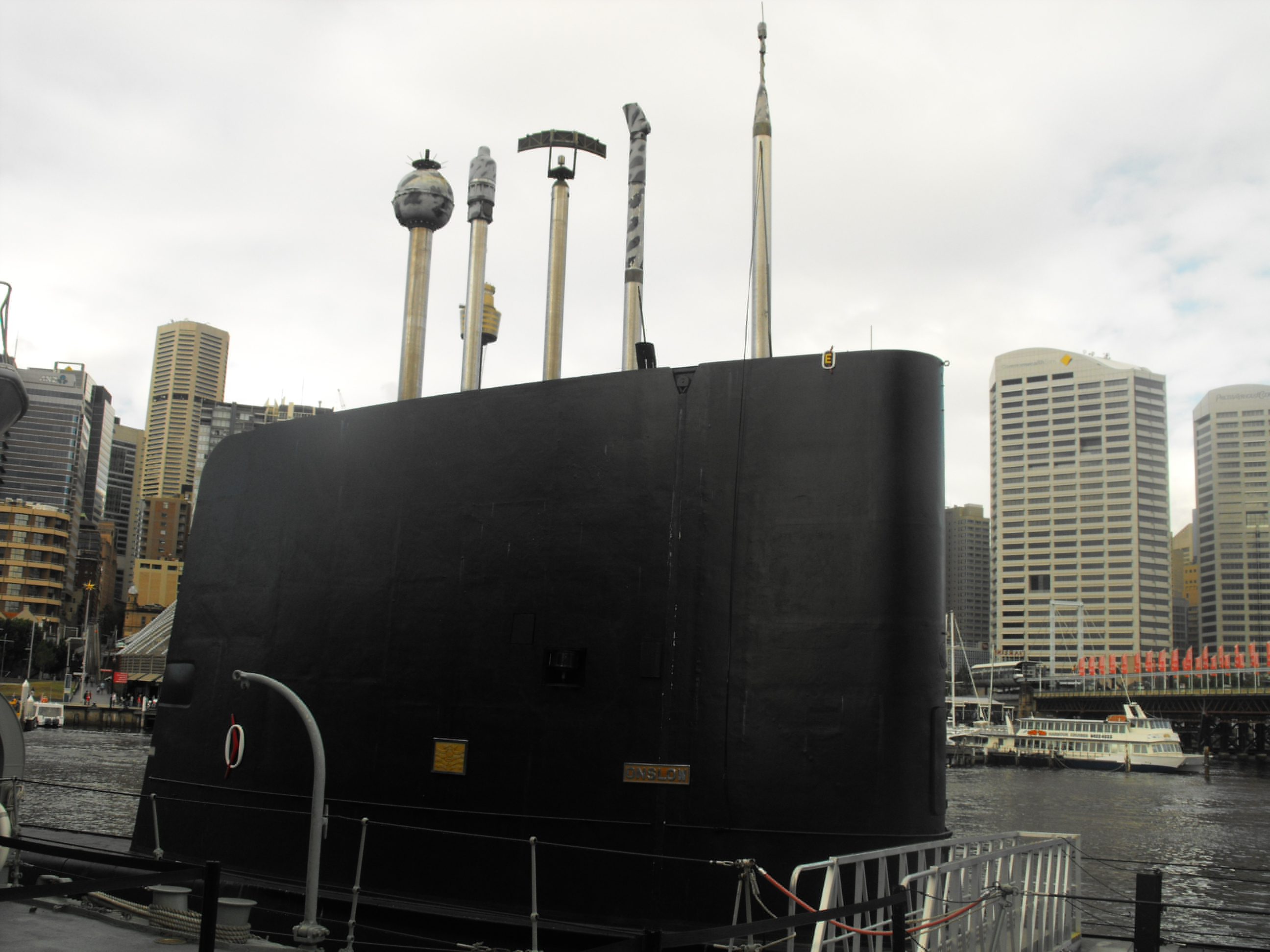
HMAS Onslow's fin and masts.

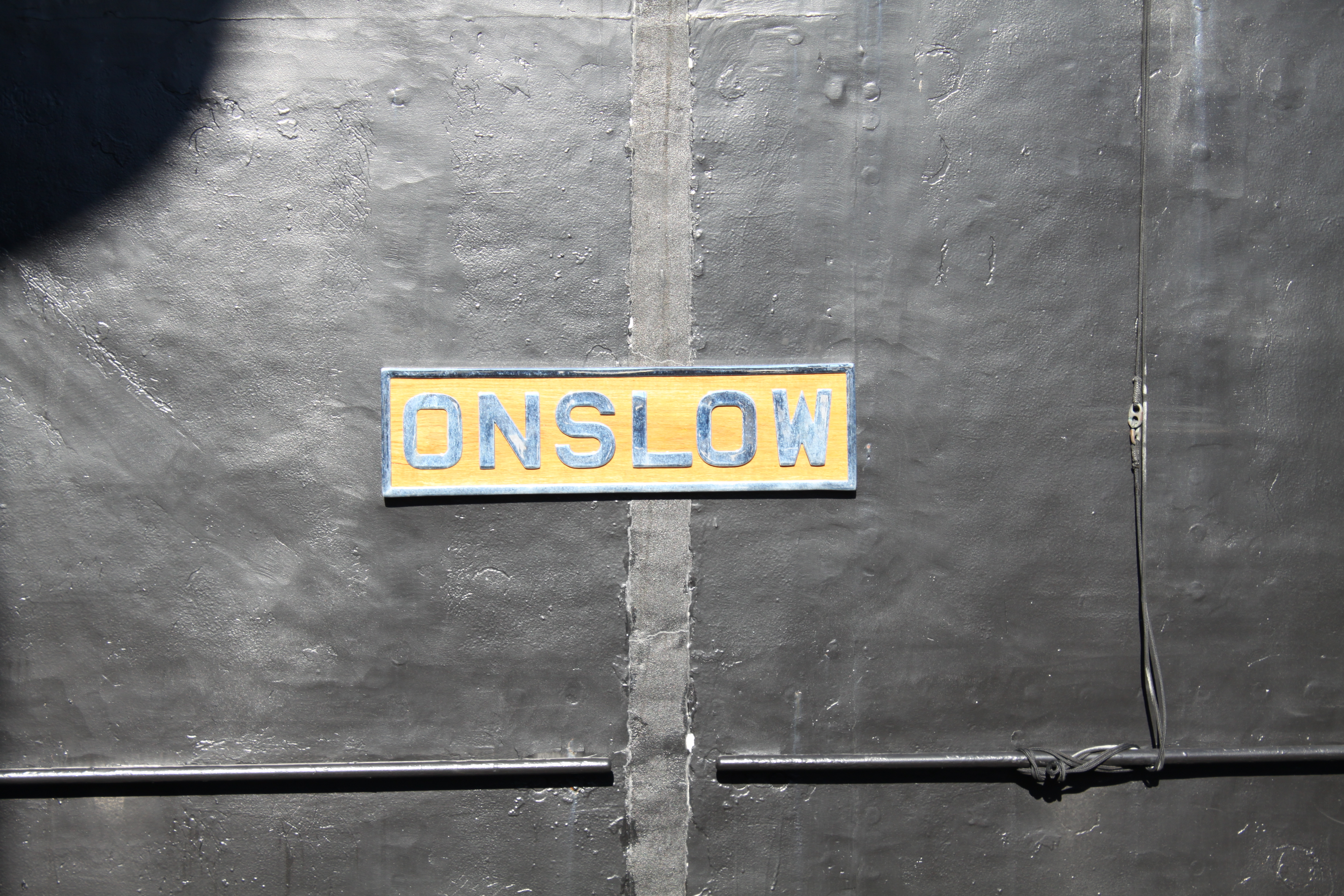
HMAS Onslow's nameplate.

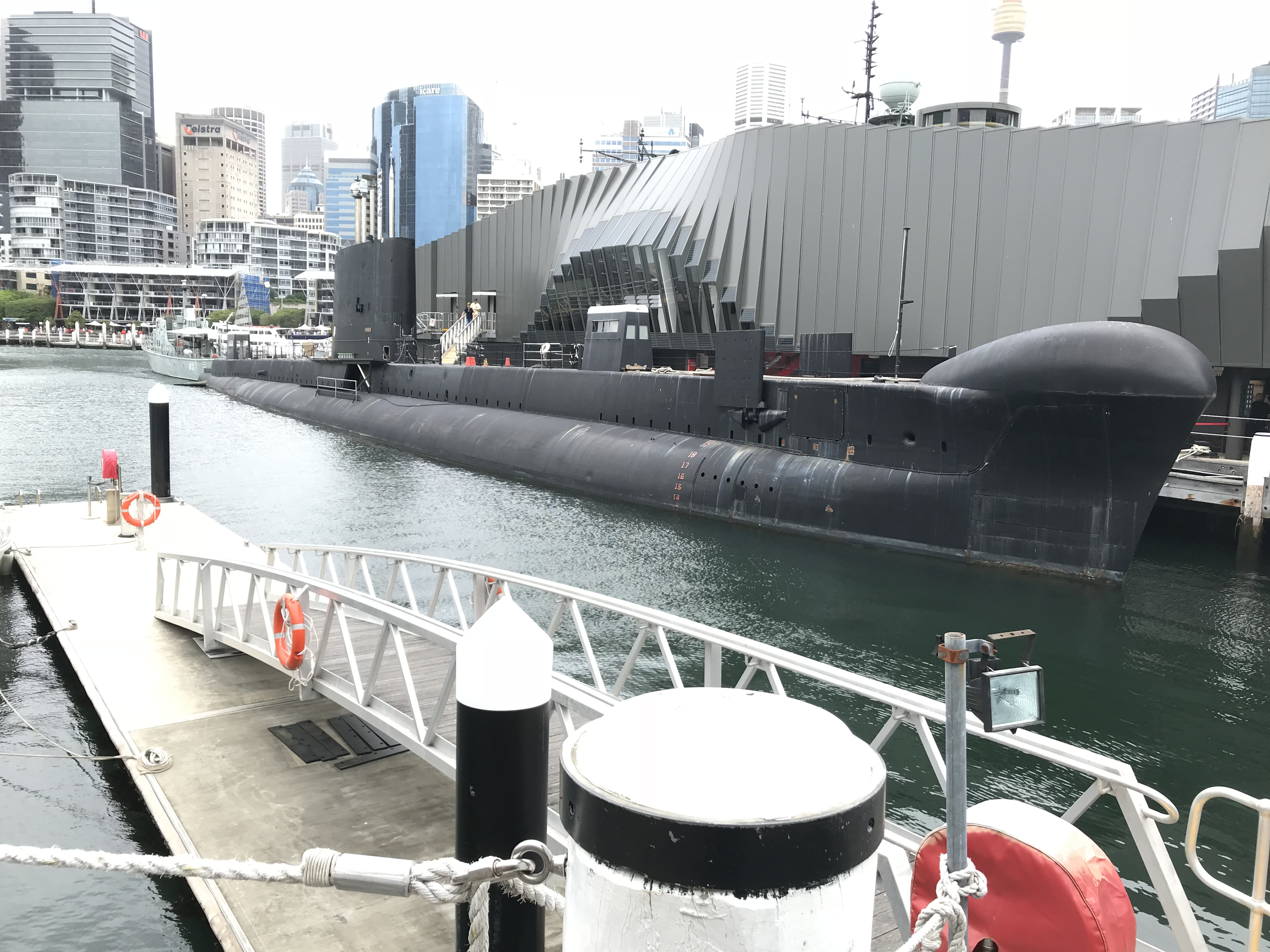
HMAS Onslow on display at the Australian National Maritime Museum in 2017

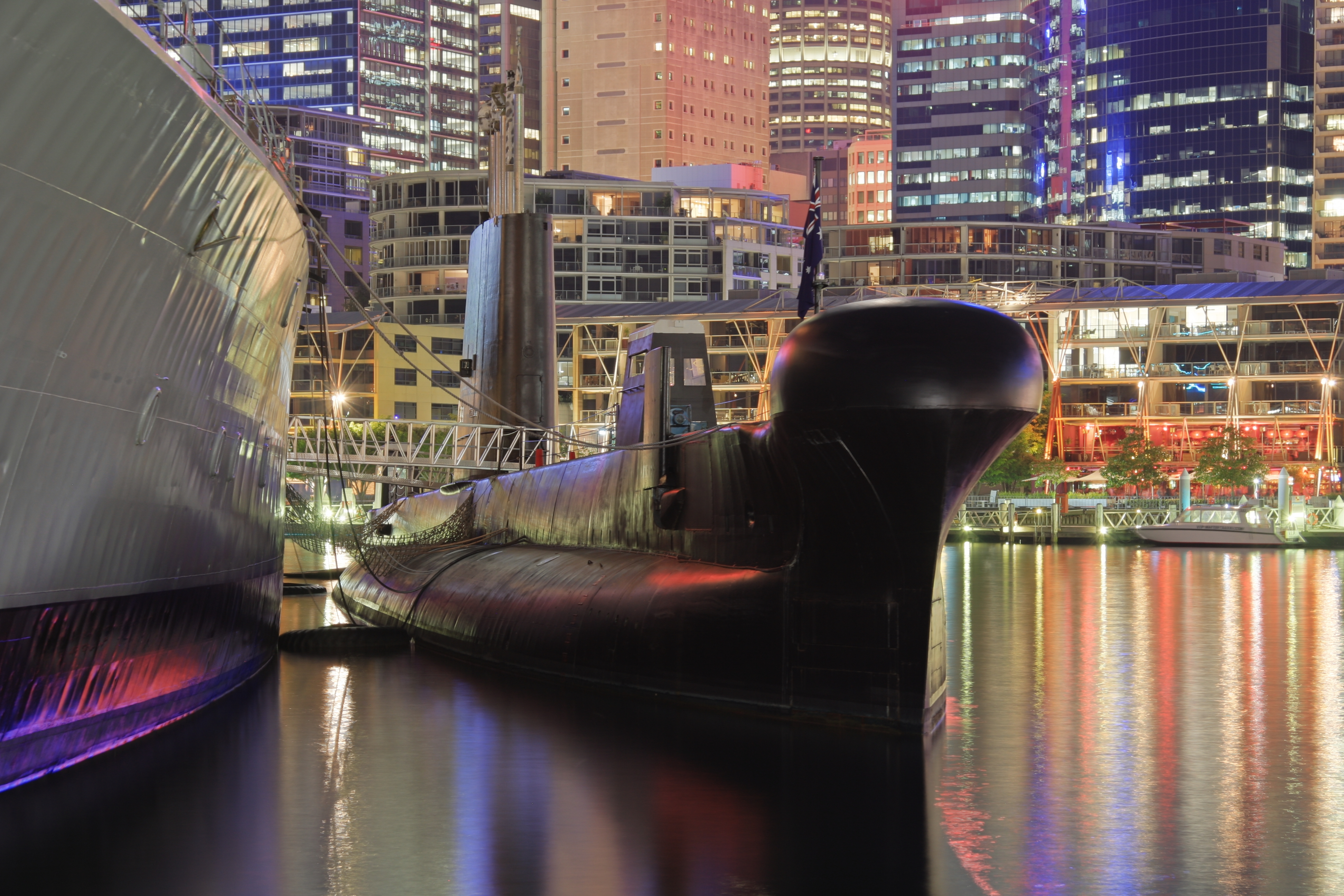
HMAS Onslow at night

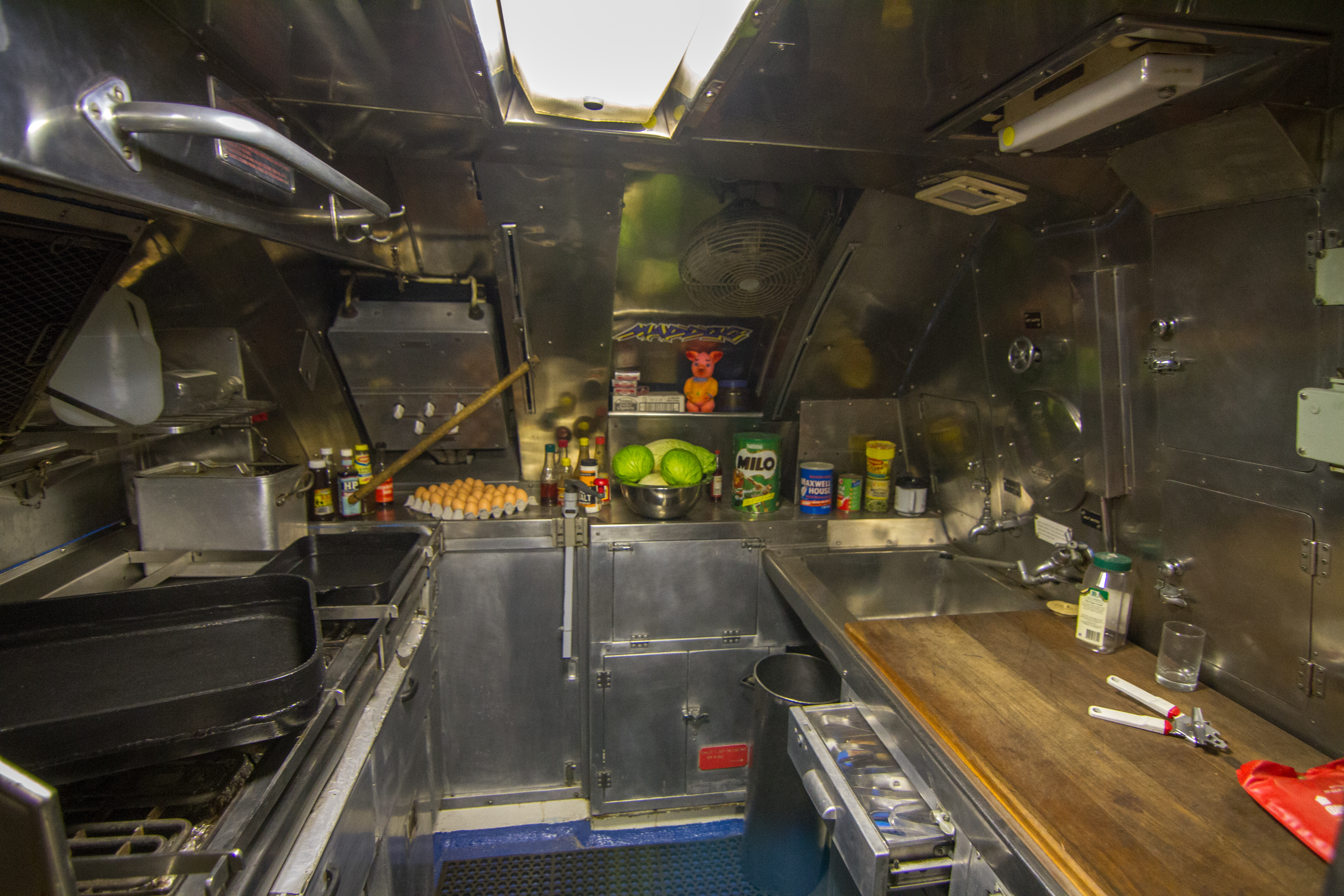
HMAS Onslow's galley
