= Onslow (1795 ship) =

History

Great Britain
- Name: Onslow
- Launched: 1789, spain
- Acquired: 1795 by purchase of a prize
- Captured: May 1797

General characteristics
- Tons burthen: 166 (bm)
- Complement: 19–22

Onslow was a Spanish vessel launched in 1789 that was taken in prize in 1795. She became a Liverpool-based slave ship in the triangular trade in enslaved people. She made one complete slave trading voyage before a French privateer captured her in 1797 as she was just on her way to embark slaves for a second voyage.

== Career ==
Onslow first appeared in Lloyd's Register (LR) in 1795.

Year	Master	Owner	Trade	Source
1795	Cartmell	Butler & Co.	Liverpool−Africa	LR

Voyage transporting enslaved people (1795–1796): Captain William Cartmell sailed from Liverpool on 9 November 1795, bound for the Bight of Benin. In 1795, 79 vessels sailed from English ports bound for the trade in enslaved people; 59 of these vessels sailed from Liverpool.

Onslow started trading on 22 January 1796, first at Porto-Novo, and then at Whydah. She left Africa on 26 May, bound for the West Indies. She stopped at Prince's Island, and arrived at Barbados on 5 August. She had embarked with 274 slaves and arrived with 274, but finally landed 271, for a 1% mortality rate. She sailed for Liverpool on 20 August and arrived there on 8 October. She had left Liverpool with 19 crew members and had suffered one crew death on her voyage.

After the passage of the Slave Trade Act 1788, masters received a bonus of £100 for a mortality rate of under 2%; the ship's surgeon received £50. For a mortality rate between two and three per cent, the bonus was halved. There was no bonus if mortality exceeded 3%.

Year	Master	Owner	Trade	Source & notes
1797	Cartmell; J.Bailiff	Butler & Co.	Liverpool−Africa	LR; lengthened and raised 1795

== Fate ==
Captain James Bailiff sailed from Liverpool on 7 May 1797, bound for West Africa. In 1797, 104 vessels sailed from English ports bound for the trade in enslaved people; 90 of these vessels sailed from Liverpool.

Lloyd's List reported on 26 May that a French privateer of 14 guns had captured Onslow, Giles, master, as she was sailing from Liverpool to Africa. (Note: Captain James Bailiff went on to make two more voyages as a captain of slave ships. On the second of these he was again captured.)

In 1797, 40 British slave ships were lost, 11 of them on the way to Africa. This was the second worst year for losses after the 50 losses in 1795. War, not maritime hazards nor slave resistance, was the greatest cause of vessel losses among British slave vessels.
