= HMS Onslow =

Three ships of the Royal Navy have been named HMS Onslow:

- HMS Onslow (1916), an Admiralty M-class destroyer launched in 1916 and scrapped in 1921. She saw action at the Battle of Jutland under the command of captain John Tovey, later Admiral of the Fleet.
- HMS Onslow was a destroyer launched in January 1941, but its name was exchanged with an O-class destroyer under construction in August 1941 was commissioned as HMS Pakenham.
- HMS Onslow (G17), an O-class destroyer launched in March 1941. It was originally called HMS Pakenham but its name was exchanged with the above destroyer in August 1941 before its commissioning in October 1941. It was transferred to the Pakistan Navy in 1949 and renamed Tippu Sultan, and later Mufafiz.

== See also ==
- HMAS Onslow, a Royal Australian Navy Oberon-class submarine, which is preserved as a museum ship in Sydney, Australia.
