= Fly on the wall =

Style of documentary-making

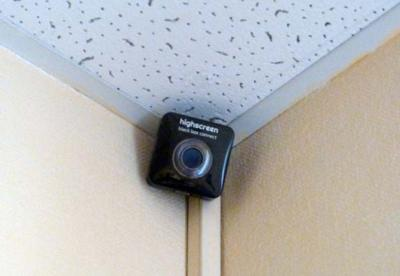
A camera up on a wall recording what is happening in the room

Fly on the wall is a style of documentary-making used in film and television production. The name derived from the idea that events are seen candidly, as a fly on a wall might see them. The metaphor originally applied to journalism and newspaper reporters, and may have been coined by Walter Lippmann in the 1920's " ...‘the fly on the wall,’ seeing all, feeling nothing, utterly detached, utterly objective ...’’.

In the purest form of fly-on-the-wall documentary-making, the camera crew works as unobtrusively as possible; however, it is also common for participants to be interviewed, often by an off-camera voice.

Decades before structured reality shows became popular, the BBC had broadcast fly-on-the-wall film Royal Family (a 1969 documentary produced in association with ITV), while 1974's The Family is said to be the earliest example of a reality TV docusoap on the BBC. In 1978 the BBC broadcast Living in the Past, recreating a British Iron Age settlement. In the late 1990s, Chris Terrill's docusoap series The Cruise made a star of singer and TV personality Jane McDonald, while Welsh cleaner Maureen Rees became popular after her appearances on BBC One's Driving School.

Other British examples include Airline, Dynamo: Magician Impossible and Channel 4's Educating... series, while in the United States popular examples include American Factory, Cops, Deadliest Catch, Big Brother and Weiner, a film about a political sex scandal which developed during a mayoral election in New York.

== See also ==
- Cinéma vérité
- Direct cinema
- Reality television
- Television documentary
