= List of people educated at The Hall School, Hampstead =

The following notable people were educated at The Hall School, Hampstead.

- Alfred Alvarez, poet and novelist
- Peter Asher, singer and actor
- Andrew Russell, 15th Duke of Bedford, landowner and peer
- David Bennett, Solicitor-General of Australia; Barrister; Queen's Counsel of all Australian States
- R. A. Bevan, advertising chief
- Simon Cadell, actor
- Jamie Catto, musician and film-maker
- Simon Clarke, sociologist
- Giles Coren, food critic and novelist
- Sir David Croom-Johnson, judge
- Richard M. Durbin, computational biologist
- Mark Durden-Smith, TV presenter
- Ben Fogle, adventurer, broadcaster and writer
- Sir Clement Freud, politician
- John Selwyn Gilbert, television scriptwriter
- Roderick Gordon, author
- James Harding, journalist and head of BBC News
- Oscar Humphries, journalist
- Richard A. Hunter, psychiatrist
- Miles Jupp, actor and comedian
- John Kampfner, political journalist
- James Klugmann, Communist intellectual
- Peter Kuenstler, civil servant
- David Lascelles, 8th Earl of Harewood, film producer
- Sir Oliver Letwin, Minister of State for Policy from May 2010; Cabinet Minister with responsibility for the Cabinet Office from 2015
- Nicholas Lezard, journalist and author
- Nick Mason, drummer at rock band Pink Floyd
- David Neuberger, former President of the Supreme Court of the United Kingdom
- Oliver Sacks, famed neurologist
- Michael Sellers, actor son of Peter Sellers
- Sir Peter Shaffer, playwright
- Jeremy Sinden, actor son of Sir Donald Sinden
- Sir Stephen Spender, English poet, novelist and essayist
- Richard Talbot Kelly, soldier and artist
- Gregory Tesser, sports broadcaster and writer
- Lionel Wigram, film producer and screenplay writer
- Daniel Wolpert, neuroscientist
