= John Selwyn Gilbert =

British television producer

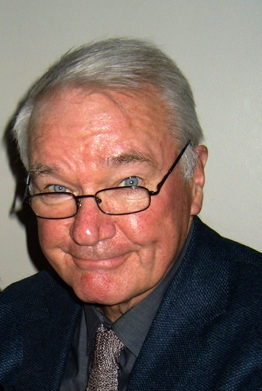
- Gilbert in 2007
- Born: March 17, 1943 (age 83)
- Occupations: Scriptwriter, producer, director
- Years active: 1969–2008

John Selwyn Winzer Gilbert (born 17 March 1943) is a BAFTA nominated British television scriptwriter, director and producer who joined the BBC in 1969 as a Production Director to help to set up the Open University and who between 1979 and 1983 made a number of documentaries about the excavation and raising of the Mary Rose.

== Early years ==
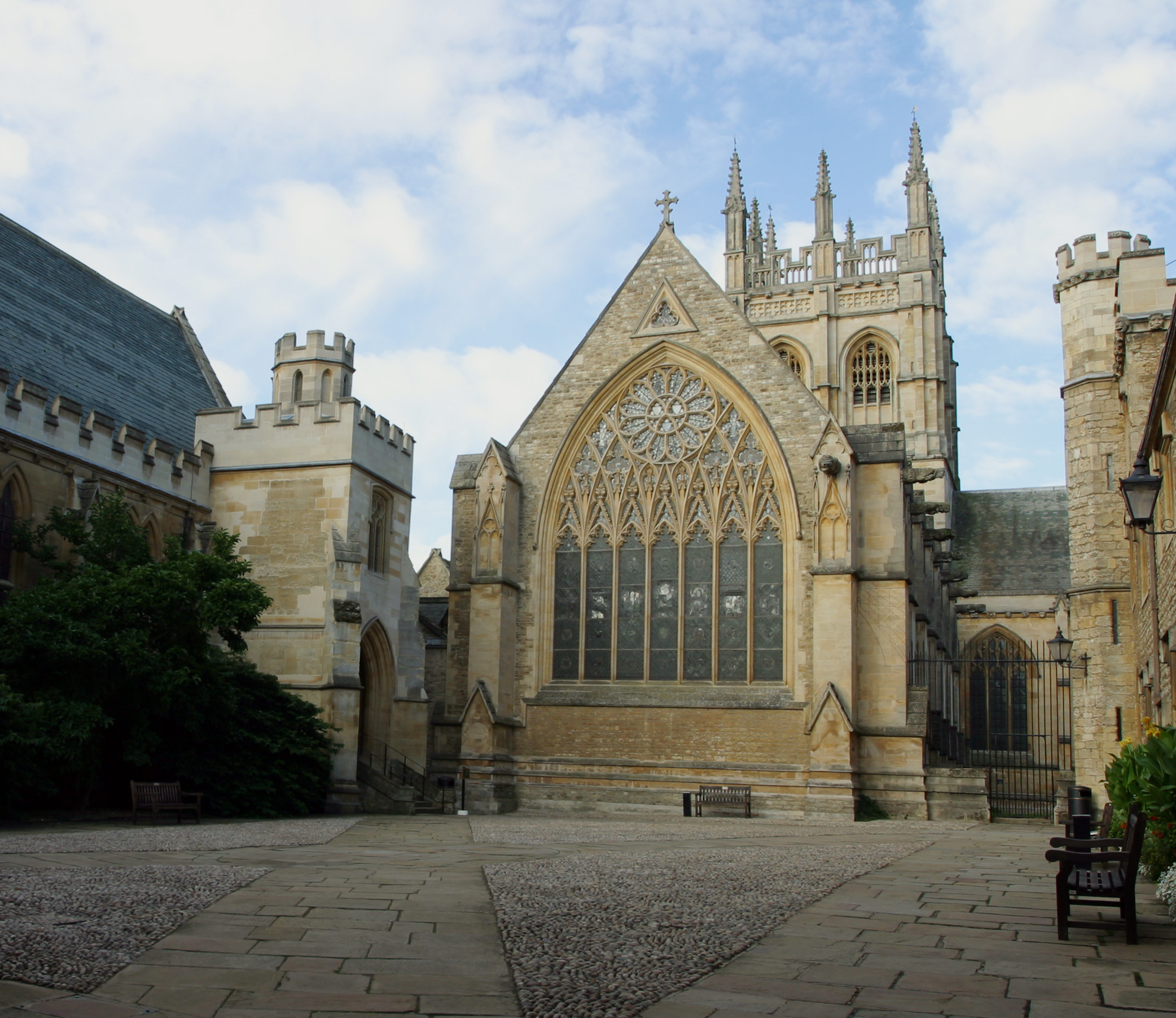
Merton College, Oxford, where Gilbert was a student

The son of Guildhall School of Music professor and flautist Geoffrey Gilbert, John Selwyn Gilbert attended the Hall School in Hampstead from 1949 to 1956, St. Paul's School from 1956 to 1960, and the Sorbonne in Paris from 1960 to 1961.

He graduated from Merton College, Oxford in 1965 with a BA in Modern History. From 1963 to 1964 he was an Assistante at the Liceo Scientifico Leonardo da Vinci in Milan, and gained a Diploma in Education at the Oxford Institute of Education in 1966.

Gilbert then worked for Argo Records as an assistant on recordings by Ewan MacColl and Peggy Seeger and as a record producer with Tom Paley, Shirley Collins, The Young Tradition and others. He recorded James Galway, who had been a student with his father, the Allegri Quartet and many others.

== Television career ==
He joined the BBC in 1969 as a Production Director to help to set up the Open University. He produced and directed classical dramas, including Woyzeck, Six Characters in Search of an Author, The Way of the World and Peer Gynt (1976) for BBC/OU Productions before moving to BBC Music and Arts in 1978 as a Producer; he produced and directed TV programmes and films about Les Noces (with Leonard Bernstein and The Royal Ballet), Sir Frederick Ashton, Evelyn Waugh and Aubrey Beardsley (1982). His documentary Beardsley and his Work appeared on television in the United Kingdom in the same week as his drama Aubrey, a BBC 'Playhouse' drama in which Beardsley was portrayed by actor John Dicks. The drama followed Beardsley's life from Oscar Wilde's arrest in April 1895, which resulted in Beardsley losing his position at The Yellow Book, to his death from tuberculosis in 1898.

While at the BBC, Gilbert also produced an arts magazine programme called Mainstream, a programme described by The Sunday Times TV critic as 'the worst programme in the history of television'; it is a comment Gilbert still treasures.

Between 1979 and 1983, Gilbert made documentaries about the excavation and raising of the Mary Rose. The first of these documentaries was cited by the British Association for the Advancement of Science and the Outside Broadcast when the Mary Rose was raised was nominated for a BAFTA award. Through his involvement in the Mary Rose project Gilbert learned to dive and organised and supervised all the underwater filming. He completed 114 working dives on the Mary Rose before the hull was raised.

After leaving the BBC in 1983, Gilbert set up his own film company, JSG Productions, producing films for Channel 4, London Weekend Television and others until 1998. He also bought and ran a successful restaurant in Bristol from 1988 to 1996. It was featured in the Good Food Guide and the Guide's Editor described Gilbert as resembling 'a cross between Patrick Moore and Keith Floyd.'

== Recent years ==
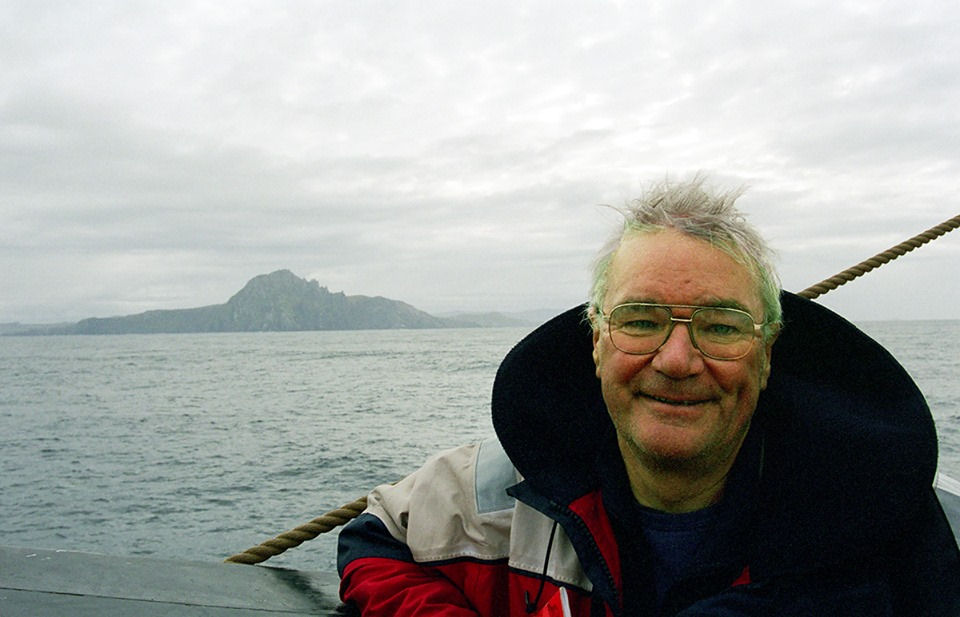
Gilbert aboard the replica of HM Bark Endeavour with Cape Horn in the background (16 April 2002). Only another 8,500 miles to go ....

Later, Gilbert sailed around the world and appeared in a series of BBC documentary films called The Ship about a 21st-century volunteer crew on a six-week journey from the east coast of Australia to Bali, Indonesia, retracing a section of the famous first voyage of James Cook aboard a replica of HM Bark Endeavour. The series was broadcast in 2002, by which time Gilbert had helped to sail the Endeavour replica from Western Australia to Whitby in Yorkshire, around Cape Horn. The photograph (right) shows a happy but exhausted Gilbert at Cape Horn, the half-way point between Australia and Whitby. In retirement, post 2008, Gilbert spends much of his time teaching and tutoring children with learning difficulties. In 2019 he published a series of short videos about Dealing with Dyslexia - the Parent's Guide which are intended to help a few people to mitigate the feelings caused when parents find their clever children cannot master reading and writing.

The John Selwyn Gilbert Collection of 69 boxes of files relating to media projects Gilbert worked on from 1967 to 1986 was donated to The National Archives at Kew. Copies of many of Gilbert's television programmes and films were donated to the British Film Institute Production Board Library in 1996 and are available for the use of bona fide students or researchers.

== Selected credits ==
- 1989–91 Spaceship Earth – ten half-hour programmes for Channel 4 (Series Producer and Director)
- 1987 GEC Centenary Film (Writer/Producer/Director)
- 1985–86 The World – A Television History – a 26 part series for Channel 4 (Director for the last eight episodes)
- 1984 David Bintley – A New Ballet at Sadler's Wells – a filmed profile for LWT's The South Bank Show (Writer/Producer/Director)
- 1983 Life and Death in Ancient Egypt – a film for BBC Two's Chronicle series (Writer/Producer/Director)
- 1982 Raising the Rose – 11 hours and 25 minutes of live outside broadcasting transmission. The production team was nominated for a BAFTA for "Best Actuality Coverage" (Producer/Presenter)
- 1982 Beardsley and his Work – a documentary linked to a play about Aubrey Beardsley (Aubrey), also by Gilbert, on the same BBC channel. (Producer/Director/Writer/Narrator)
- 1980 The Wreck of the Mary Rose – the first of four films about the Mary Rose project for BBC's Chronicle, which won a Certificate of Merit from the British Association for the Advancement of Science. (Writer/Producer/Director)
- 1979 Frederick Ashton – an Omnibus programme about the choreographer. Won a medal from the New York Film Festival.. (Writer/Producer/Director)

== Publications ==
- John Selwyn Gilbert and Zoë Dominic, 'Frederick Ashton: a Choreographer and His Ballets' Published by Harrap (1971) ISBN 0-245-50351-X
- John Selwyn Gilbert, 'Endeavour at Cape Horn'. Published by JSG Productions (2012) ISBN 978-1-4716-5730-6
