= Byron House School =

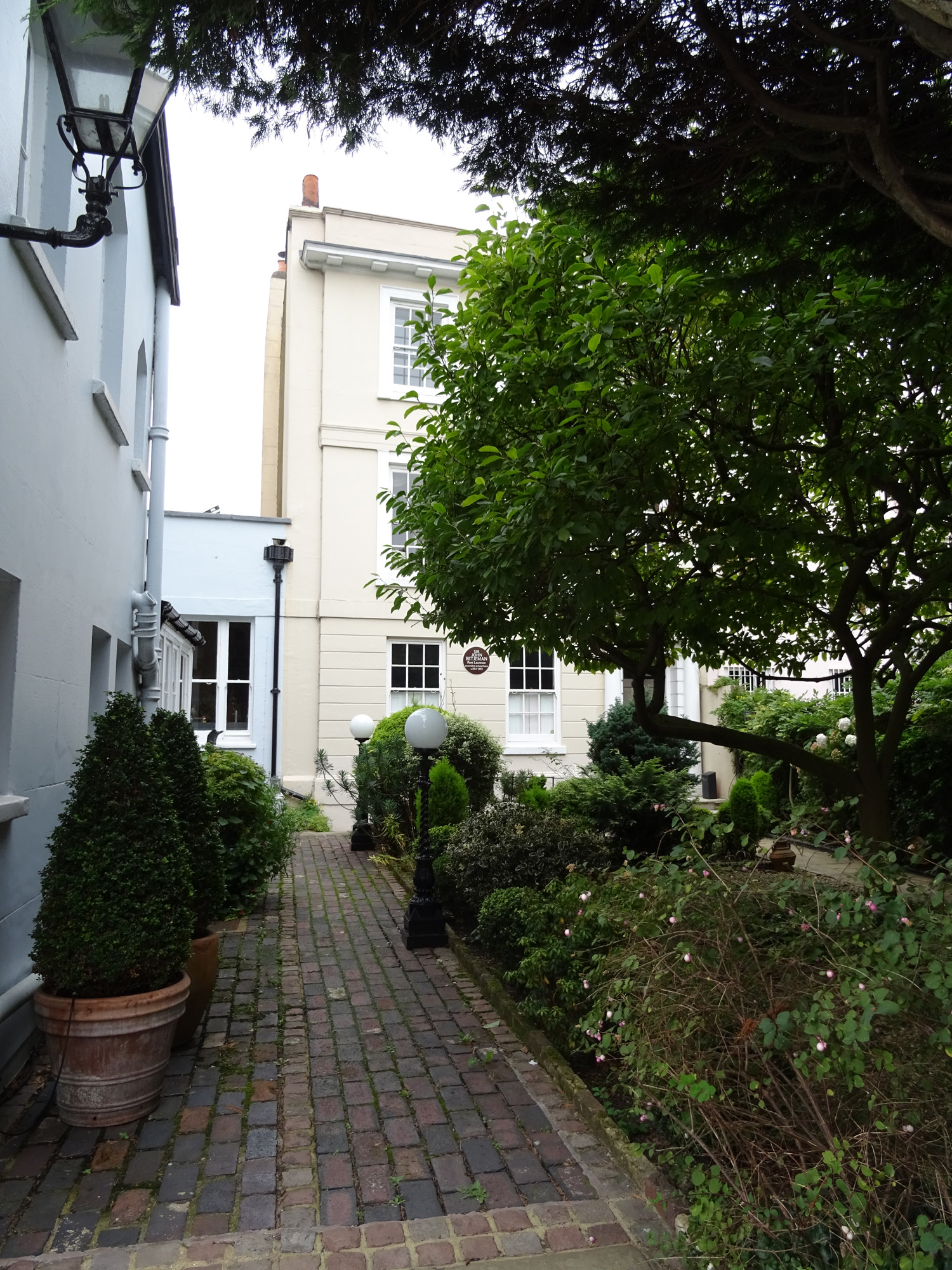

Location
- North Road, Highgate; London, N6 4BD; England

Information
- Type: Preparatory day school
- Established: 1897; 129 years ago
- Gender: Coeducational
- Age: 5 to 13

Byron House School was an independent preparatory school in Highgate, London.

== History ==
Byron House was founded in 1897 as a progressive prep school "favoured by London's intelligentsia and famous for its advanced teaching methods". Stephen Hawking, while attending the school, complained to his parents that he "wasn't learning anything", and later blamed its teaching methods for his failure to learn to read "until the fairly late age of eight". Another former pupil, Sir James Lighthill was the Lucasian Professor of Mathematics directly before Hawking.

In 1939, pupils were evacuated to Cambridge and between 1940 and 1944, 24 children from Byron House were evacuated to Ottawa, Canada.

John Betjeman was taught by T. S. Eliot at Byron House, before being sent to the Dragon School in Oxford.

== Notable former pupils ==
- Elizabeth Taylor, actress
- John Betjeman, writer and poet
- Stephen Hawking, physicist
- Maurice Hill, geophysicist attended briefly before Highgate School
- Anne Atkins, broadcaster
- Henry Fairly, journalist
- James Lighthill, mathematician
- Gregory Tesser, sports journalist
- Charles Gidley Wheeler, novelist
