= Charles Gidley Wheeler =

British screenwriter and novelist

- Born: Charles Hugh Gidley Wheeler; 21 August 1938
- Died: 15 April 2010 (aged 71); Kempsford, Gloucestershire, England
- Occupation: Writer
- Writing career
- Genres: television drama, historical novels, philosophy, memoir
- Website: www.charlesgidleywheeler.com

Charles Gidley Wheeler (1938–2010), also known as Charles Gidley, was a television screenwriter and historical novelist whose work has been acclaimed in Publishers Weekly, The Washington Post, Kirkus Reviews, and The New York Times.

Wheeler was educated at Byron House, University College School, London and Durham University, where he read Philosophy. He served in the Royal Navy from 1954 to 1979. His best known work is The Raging of the Sea.

== Works ==
=== Blackwood's Magazine ===
- Gem of the Orient (August 1965)
- Forgotten Island (May 1966)
- Night Patrol (August 1967)
- Cassino Anniversary (March 1969)
- New Gold (January 1970)
- Scouse, Sage and Sultan (August 1973)
- Padre Batista's Revolution (January 1975

=== Television drama ===
- Warship (five episodes: All of One Company, Under the Surface, Man in Reserve, Countercharge, Jack Fell Down) BBC Television
- Wings (two episodes: Zeppelin, No Medals) BBC Television
- Thundercloud (four episodes: Pigs Might Fly, 14 Jun 79, Don't Go Near The Water, 19 Jul 79, Bats in the Belfry, 9 Aug 79, Goodbye Mr Tortoise, 18 Dec 79.) Yorkshire Television
- The Sandbaggers (two episodes: My Name is Anna Wiseman, Who Needs Enemies?) Yorkshire Television

=== Novels ===
- The River Running By (First published 1981) Publishing history: UK: Deutsch/Fontana; US: St. Martin's Press; Argentina (South American Spanish): Editores Emece under title El Rio que Pasa)
- The Raging of the Sea (First published 1984) Publishing history: UK: Deutsch/Fontana; US: Viking Press
- The Believer (First published 1985) Publishing history: UK: Deutsch/Fontana
- Armada (First published 1987) Publishing history: UK: Weidenfeld & Nicolson/Fontana; US: Viking Press; Brazil (Brazilian): Globo
- The Fighting Spirit (First published 1989) Publishing history: UK: Collins/Fontana
- The Crying of the Wind (First published 1992) Publishing history: UK: HarperCollins/Fontana
