= Gregory Tesser =

English sports journalist (born 1946)

- Born: Gregory Ronald Tesser; 11 May 1946 (age 80); Highgate, London, England
- Occupations: Sports broadcaster, writer

Gregory Ronald Tesser (born 11 May 1946) is an English sports broadcaster and writer. He was educated at Byron House, The Hall School, and one of Britain's most ancient Public Schools, The King's School, Gloucester.

In 1964 he became the publicity manager of Georgie Fame and The Yardbirds. In 1965 he launched The Amateur Footballer magazine, which he closed down at the beginning of 1970-71. During his time as editor/publisher he exposed the hypocrisy of 'shamateurism' in English football, which resulted in a mini-documentary in 1969 during Ian Wooldridge's Sports Arena show on ITV. In the same year, Tesser became a leading football agent for the likes of Peter Osgood, Charlie Cooke and Rodney Marsh.

During the 1990s Tesser worked on BBC TV's definitive documentary on the history of football - Kicking and Screaming - and was interviewed for the book of the same name, written by Rogan Taylor and Andrew Ward, allied to the series and published in 1995.

His article for The Daily Telegraph in 1995 on more regionalisation in non-League football helped change the way the leagues were structured.

In 1998 he began a series of celebrity interviews for both Esquire and GQ, beginning with Tony Blair and later to include Prince Philip, on their passion for sport.

He currently writes on rugby union for Country Life magazine, with previews of, amongst others, the annual 6 Nations tournament, having also been a features writer for the Rugby Times. In 2011, the year of the Rugby World Cup, he not only wrote a preview of the tournament for Country Life, but also penned a piece for The Jewish Chronicle on the many Jewish players that have lit up the game since before the First World War. His book Chelsea FC In The Swinging 60s: Football's First Rock 'N' Roll Club was published in August 2013 by The History Press. It chronicles his life as PR Man for Georgie Fame & The Yardbirds and his years as agent and business partner of The King of Stamford Bridge himself, Peter Osgood.
