= The Ship (TV series) =

- Directed by: Chris Terrill
- Starring: Alexander Cook, Chris Terrill, John Jeffrey, John Selwyn Gilbert, Andrew Lewis & James Rees
- Narrated by: Dominic Frisby
- Theme music composer: John Harle
- Country of origin: United Kingdom
- Original language: English
- No. of series: 1
- No. of episodes: 6

Production
- Executive producer: Laurence Rees
- Producer: Chris Terrill
- Running time: 360 min

Original release
- Network: BBC Two
- Release: 20 August – 24 September 2002

The Ship: Retracing Cook's Endeavour Voyage is a documentary series about a 21st-century voluntary crew on a six-week journey from the east coast of Australia to Jakarta, Indonesia, retracing the famous voyage of Lieutenant James Cook aboard a replica of HM Bark Endeavour.

The 55 men and women on board – among them the director, producer and cameraman Chris Terrill – came from several countries and nationalities. The crew traced Cook's footsteps from one historical landmark to another. All of the volunteers lived and worked as 18th century sailors, but were not required to wear period costumes.

The crew consisted of a core of around a dozen full-time sailors with the skills needed to manage a square-rigger, under the leadership of Captain Chris Blake. These "regulars" were supplemented by a varied group of volunteers, amongst whom were groups of specialists – botanists (under Kew's Tom Hoblyn), navigators (led by John Jeffrey from the Royal Institute of Navigation), and an international group of historians. Regardless of specialisation, all the volunteers acted as deck-hands under the supervision of the permanent crew.

The Endeavour replica had some modern conveniences: a satellite phone for emergencies, and a flush toilet in the lower deck for use while sailing in the Great Barrier Reef. There was also modern navigation equipment (GPS and radar), but the navigation team were not given access to these, nor to modern charts, and instead practised mid-18th Century techniques, such as the Lunar Distance Method for finding longitude.

The show originally aired on BBC Two from 20 August to 24 September 2002. The trip was filmed a year earlier and the episode where the crew were informed of the 9/11 attacks was shown on 10 September 2002.

In 2004, an article written by Alexander Cook detailing his experience during the re-enactment was published in the History Workshop Journal no.57.

== Companion book ==
- Baker, Simon (2002). The Ship: Retracing Cook's Endeavour Voyage. BBC Books. ISBN 978-0-563-53463-1.
