= Sheila Quigley =

British thriller writer (1947–2020)

Sheila Quigley (18 July 1947 – 24 April 2020) was a British author of thrillers.

== Career ==
In 2003, Sheila Quigley became a national news story when Random House acquired her first novel, Run For Home, with major coverage throughout the press and television. A documentary about Sheila and the making of Run for Home made by producer/director Chris Terrill was broadcast on BBC1.

Run for Home, Bad Moon Rising, Living on a Prayer and Every Breath You Take were published by Random. Hungry Eyes was published as part of Creme de la Crime Ltd's Criminal Tendencies book, which was released in April 2009 to help raise funds for a breast cancer charity, and was a short story set in the Seahills. In 2011 it was published as a bonus story inside Nowhere Man, showing how the two series of books are linked. Black Betty was another Seahills short story, published by Byker Books in the anthology, 'Radgepacket Vol 2'. The Road to Hell was published by Tonto Books.

In September 2010, Sheila published the first of a trilogy of novels, featuring the new lead character of DI Mike Yorke and his sidekick Smiler, a psychic street kid.

=== Homicide in Houghton ===
As part of the Houghton Feast celebrations each October, Sheila and local historian Paul Lanagan led an investigation which visited the fictional murder scenes from Sheila's novels. The tours typically departed from Houghton library, trailed across the town and returned to the library where attendees were treated to a sneak preview of Sheila's next novel.

== Personal life ==
Quigley began work at the age of 15 in Hepworths, a tailoring factory where she was employed as a presser.

She married when she was 18 but was later divorced. She had three daughters and a son from the relationship.

Quigley lived on the Homelands Estate in Houghton-le-Spring near Durham, opposite a field which became the fictional location of the council housing estate in her Seahills books.

Quigley died in Sunderland, on April 24, 2020.

== Published works ==
- Hungry Eyes (short story) (2008)
- Black Betty (short story) (2009)
- The Road to Hell (2009)
- Lady in Red (2014)
- The Sound of Silence (2015)
- Killing Me Softly (2017)

=== Seahills ===
These novels are set in the fictional estate of Seahills in Houghton-le-Spring in the City of Sunderland.

- Run for Home (2004)
- Bad Moon Rising (2005)
- Living on a Prayer (2006)
- Every Breath You Take (2007)

=== Mike Yorke ===
- Thorn in My Side (2010)
- Nowhere Man (2011)
- The Final Countdown (2012)
