= Zoë Dominic =

British photographer

- Born: 4 July 1920; London, United Kingdom
- Died: 11 January 2011 (aged 90)
- Known for: Photography

Zoë Dominic OBE (4 July 1920 – 11 January 2011) was a British dance and theatre photographer.

Dominic's work as a theatre photographer began in the Royal Court Theatre around 1957. She became known for photographing the postwar British theatre revival, including actors Laurence Olivier, Joan Plowright and Maggie Smith and performers Maria Callas, Margot Fonteyn and Rudolf Nureyev.

John Selwyn Gilbert wrote of her: "I know of no other photographer who got closer to the real spirit of dancers and the dance than Zoë Dominic. She was a remarkable photographer and inspired great trust in the artists she took as subjects. If she caught a dancer in an unflattering pose or making a mistake, a drooping wrist, a lazy, half-pointed foot, she would not print the picture."

She was awarded an OBE in 2006 and the Royal Photographic Society's Hood medal in 1986.

== Publications ==
- John Selwyn Gilbert and Zoë Dominic, Frederick Ashton: A Choreographer and His Ballets, Harrap (1971). ISBN 0-245-50351-X.
- Janet Baker and Zoë Dominic, Full Circle, an autobiographical Journal (1982). ISBN 978-0-531-09876-9.
