= Chris Terrill =

British anthropologist and adventurer

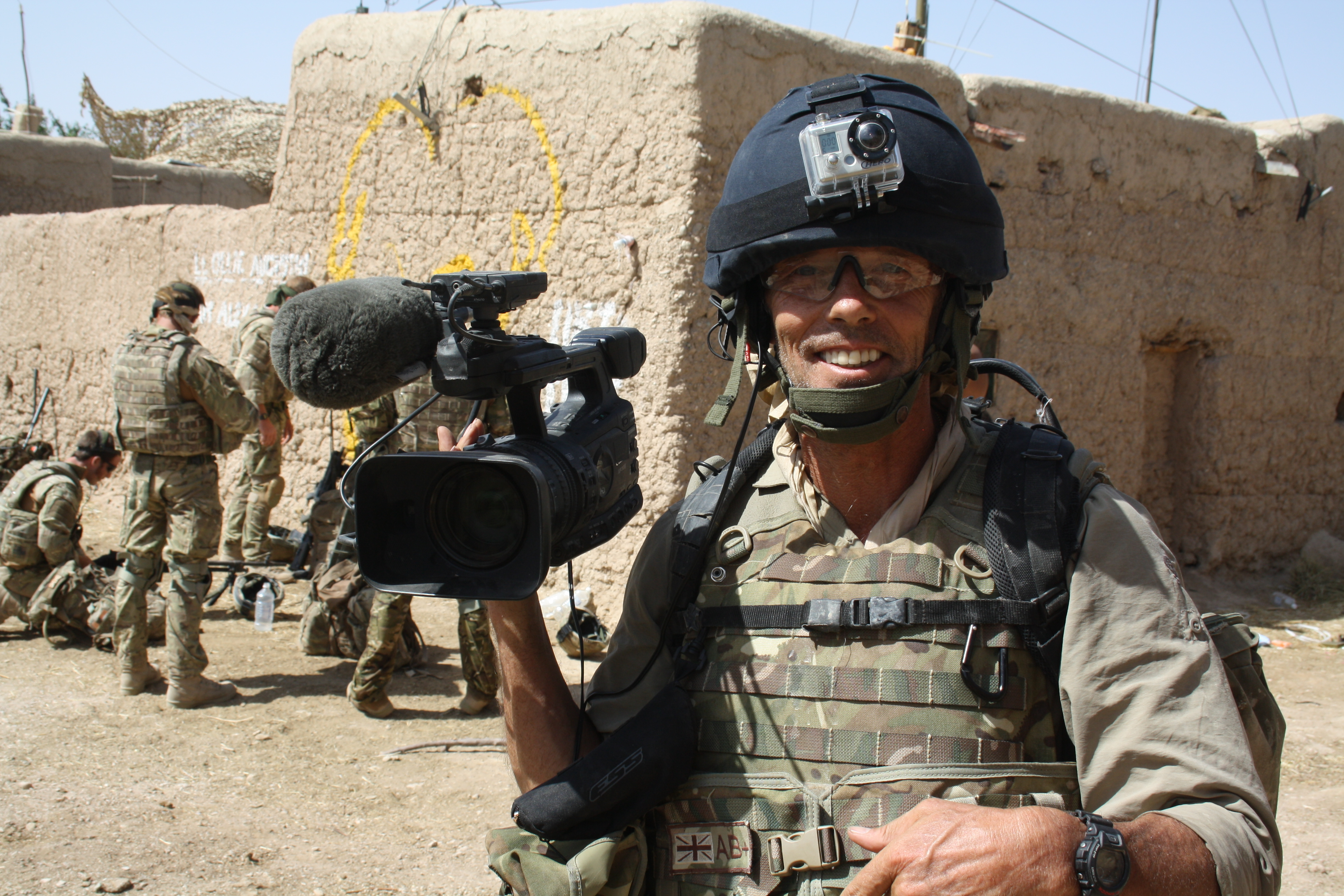
- Terrill in 2011
- Born: 1952 (age 73–74)
- Education: Durham University
- Known for: anthropologist; author; film-maker

Chris Terrill (born 1952) is a British anthropologist, adventurer, broadcaster, author and film-maker.

== Biography ==
Born in Brighton, Sussex, in 1952, Terrill attended Brighton College 1965–1970, and then went to Durham University, where he gained a joint-honours degree in Geography and Anthropology. Between 1976 and 1977 he lived with the remote Acholi Tribe of Southern Sudan where he carried out doctoral research on the impact of civil war on the tribal society before taking up the post of head of geography at Rendcomb College in Gloucestershire. In 1983, he left teaching to become a full-time professional anthropologist working for the International Disaster Institute and the UN in Geneva and throughout the famine-gripped and war-ravaged areas of Africa. Later he moved into broadcasting almost by accident. After giving an interview about his time in Africa to the BBC African Service he was offered a short term 3-month contract to work for the Service as a research Africanist. Finding he had a natural aptitude for programme making his contract was extended and so he decided to change careers and became a full time producer for the BBC World Service specialising in African affairs. After five years in radio, in which he engaged in current affairs, documentaries and drama, Terrill joined BBC television as a documentary producer, making investigative documentaries and observational films and series about communities all over the world.

As a programme maker, Terrill has always favoured anthropological methodology, particularly participant observation, (Note: Participant observation—a type of research strategy. It is a widely used methodology in many disciplines, particularly, cultural anthropology, but also sociology, communication studies, and social psychology. Its aim is to gain a close and intimate familiarity with a given group of individuals (such as a religious, occupational, or sub cultural group, or a particular community) and their practices through an intensive involvement with people in their natural environment, usually over an extended period of time.) rather than more conventional documentary making techniques. As a Fellow of the Royal Anthropological Institute and the Royal Geographical Society, Terrill is regarded as a practising anthropologist/geographer who uses film as his primary research tool and recording medium in the field.

He won an Emmy for outstanding investigative journalism for a film called Ape Trade. This Inside Story Special (BBC1) exposed the major gangs smuggling endangered orangutans to illegal markets in Taiwan, the US and Russia. (Note: To achieve this Terrill went undercover as a wildlife smuggler in Jakarta, Singapore and Miami. In a later film called Women Trade, that exposed criminal gangs trading in women from the developing world for the sex market in Europe, Terrill posed as a woman trader in the Dominican Republic as well as in Denmark and Belgium.) Other notable films/series he made for the BBC were Subway, Yellow Line, Race Game, Miami Wild, HMS Brilliant, Alison's Last Mountain, Beloved Country, Soho Stories (see below), The Cruise, Jailbirds, Tito's Story, Through the Eyes of the Old and The Ship. After 20 years at the BBC, and with over 100 prime time films and numerous awards to his name, he left the corporation in 2003 after being headhunted by Elisabeth Murdoch for her newly set up Shine company. For Shine Terrill made several prime time music and arts films and a major series about the Royal Navy (Shipmates BBC1). Two years later Terrill set up his own company, Uppercut Films, and began to specialise in military and high adventure documentaries (Note: Uppercut also has a small but vibrant arts department which specialises in theatre based films due to Terrill's passion for live theatre: "When you have your own film company you can choose what films you want to make—it is like having a massive toybox full of all your favourite toys. And you can keep getting new ones." (Terrill, Sept 2008 when asked why he chose to make Theatreland at the same time as working with the Royal Marines.))—though always concentrating on communities/groups and their internal dynamics. In 2007, he documented and participated in the rigorous eight months training with the Royal Marine Commandos after which he followed the newly qualified recruits to the front line in Afghanistan for their first taste of real war. Terrill is the only civilian (and, at 55, the oldest person) to complete and pass all four commando tests for which he was awarded the iconic green beret on merit and made an honorary Royal Marines Commando. . (Note: The DJ Jimmy Savile was a recipient of an honorary green beret although he did not attempt all four commando tests. After his death, following allegations of sexual misconduct, he was posthumously stripped of his honorary green beret. Gethin Jones attempted the last of the tests, the 30-mile run across Dartmoor but finished in a time of 8 hours 20 minutes – 20 minutes over the pass time of 8 hours)

Terrill produces his own camerawork and sound recording without a film crew. This "lone wolf" technique is a hallmark of his work. Using the new digital technology, he was the first mainstream filmmaker to experiment as a self-shooting/self-recording director in the mid-1990s when he made Soho Stories for the BBC; a seminal series that won him the Royal Television Society Award for Innovation. This series which explored London's famous and flamboyant Soho district, was one of the first to be dubbed docu-soap in its style of filmmaking. Terrill then went on to refine his techniques on prime time series such as The Cruise (BBC1), Jailbirds (BBC1), (Note: For this series Terrill spent eight months in prison.) Through the Eyes of the Old (BBC1), The Ship (BBC2), Shipmates (BBC1) and two feature documentary specials on Charlotte Church—Spreading Her Wings (BBC1) and Confessions of a Teen-angel (ITV1). Commando: On the Front Line (ITV1)—an account of Royal Marine Commandos fighting in Afghanistan was followed by Nature's Fury (ITV1) a trilogy on the world's greatest storms and their impact on communities. (Note: Terrill has established a reputation as the thinking man's adventurer. His quests invariably lead him to the world's hotspots and his focus is usually on the victims of war, poverty or natural hazards, His approach is analytical and searching and his films are not typical "made for TV" adventure. The Radio Times published one article about Terrill's work which was titled rather provocatively: Meet the Explorer who Makes Bear Grylls Look Like Barbie)

In 2009 Terrill made a series on the Theatre Royal, Haymarket, London, called Theatreland for Sky Arts. This was an intimate portrait of theatre people at work and featured Ian McKellen, Patrick Stewart, Simon Callow, Ronald Pickup and Anna Friel. In the same year he made a two-part film series about Royal Marines, badly injured in Afghanistan, attempting to climb in the high Himalayas (Wartorn Warriors—Sky1). (Note: This series was shortlisted for the 2010 Mind Mental Health Media Awards and one of the films' main contributors, Marine Danny Claricoates, received 'The Speaking Out Award' for his courage in talking so openly about his own Post Traumatic Stress Disorder after seeing his two best friends blown up and killed in front of him.) In 2010 he spent six months on HMS Manchester in the Caribbean filming counter narcotics operations as well as humanitarian disaster relief during the hurricane season (Royal Navy: Caribbean Patrol for Channel Five and National Geographic). In 2011 Terrill returned to working with the Royal Marines when he joined 42 Commando in the dangerous Nad e Ali (north) district of Helmand Province. This was for a 6-part series commissioned by Channel Five entitled "Royal Marines: Mission Afghanistan" transmitted in January/February 2012.

In late 2011 Terrill embarked on a project that brought together the military and the theatre. The Theatre Royal, Haymarket (where Terrill had filmed Theatreland in 2009) put on a play using injured soldiers and marines as the actors, singers, and dancers. The play, written by the poet Owen Sheers and based on the experiences of the soldiers mostly in Afghanistan, was called The Two Worlds of Charlie F and was performed on 22 January 2012. Terrill's feature-length film entitled Theatre of War, documenting the preparation of the play, was shown on BBC1's Imagine strand and was nominated for a prestigious Grierson Award in the best arts documentary category.

In 2014 Terrill's current affairs film for the BBC: Marine A: Criminal or Casualty of War? won the Evcom Clarion Award for ethics in journalism.

In 2015 Terrill became a Fellow of the Maritime Foundation and was presented with a Lifetime Achievement Award.

Throughout 2016 and 2017 Terrill was embedded in the ship's company of HMS Queen Elizabeth to make a major series for the BBC about the largest warship ever built for the Royal Navy, "Britain's Biggest Warship". He returned to HMS Queen Elizabeth in 2018 and spent four months at sea to make a second series, "Britain's Biggest Warship: Goes to Sea". This focuses on the marrying of the ship with the F35 Lightning Stealth Fighter off the eastern seaboard of the US.

In January 2018 Terrill was conferred Doctor of Science at the Winter Congregation of Durham University "for pioneering work in anthropology and filmmaking"

In 2019 Terrill finished filming on a project that had take him 25 years to complete. Called The Last Mountain, this feature documentary for cinematic release told the story of Tom and Kate Ballard, the son and daughter of Alison Hargreaves, an experienced female mountaineer. Shot in high altitude mountain locations in the Himalayas, the Karakoram as well as the French and Italian Alps, The Last Mountain was released in 2020. So far, the film has garnered eight international awards and a further three nominations including two for the Griersons - the British Documentary Awards.

For seven months in 2021 Terrill was back on HMS Queen Elizabeth for her first operational deployment to the South China Sea. This was to film for a six part series for the BBC called “The Warship: Tour of Duty” shown on prime time BBC2 for the first time in January and February 2023.

Terrill lectures widely on film making techniques – especially on working solo in the field. He holds regular workshops for young filmmakers.

== Sport ==
Breaking the World Record for a marathon on crutches

A keen athlete Terrill has represented his county (Sussex) in athletics and rugby (he played his last competitive game of rugby for the Old Brightonians at the age of 70). He is also an enthusiastic boxer, squash player and cricketer. In 2024, without realising it, he broke the world record for completing a marathon on crutches after suffering a serious sports injury leading to a full hip replacement. Just a few months after surgery, and running on crutches to raise money for the Royal Navy and Royal Marines Charity, he completed the 2024 Brighton Marathon in 6hrs 11mins & 11 seconds beating the previous world record by 13 minutes. The record was eventually ratified by Guinness in Feb 2025. He is now running marathons again on two legs.

== Personal life ==
In 1999 Terrill was engaged for a brief period to former glamour model Heather Mills. He proposed to her on a fishing boat whilst sailing up the Mekong River in Cambodia, where they were making a film about landmines.

In 2009 Terrill married the BAFTA award-winning filmmaker Christine Hall.

On 9 February 2013 Terrill received a full apology in open court from News UK for repeatedly hacking his phone in 2005/06. They also paid undisclosed but substantial damages plus costs.

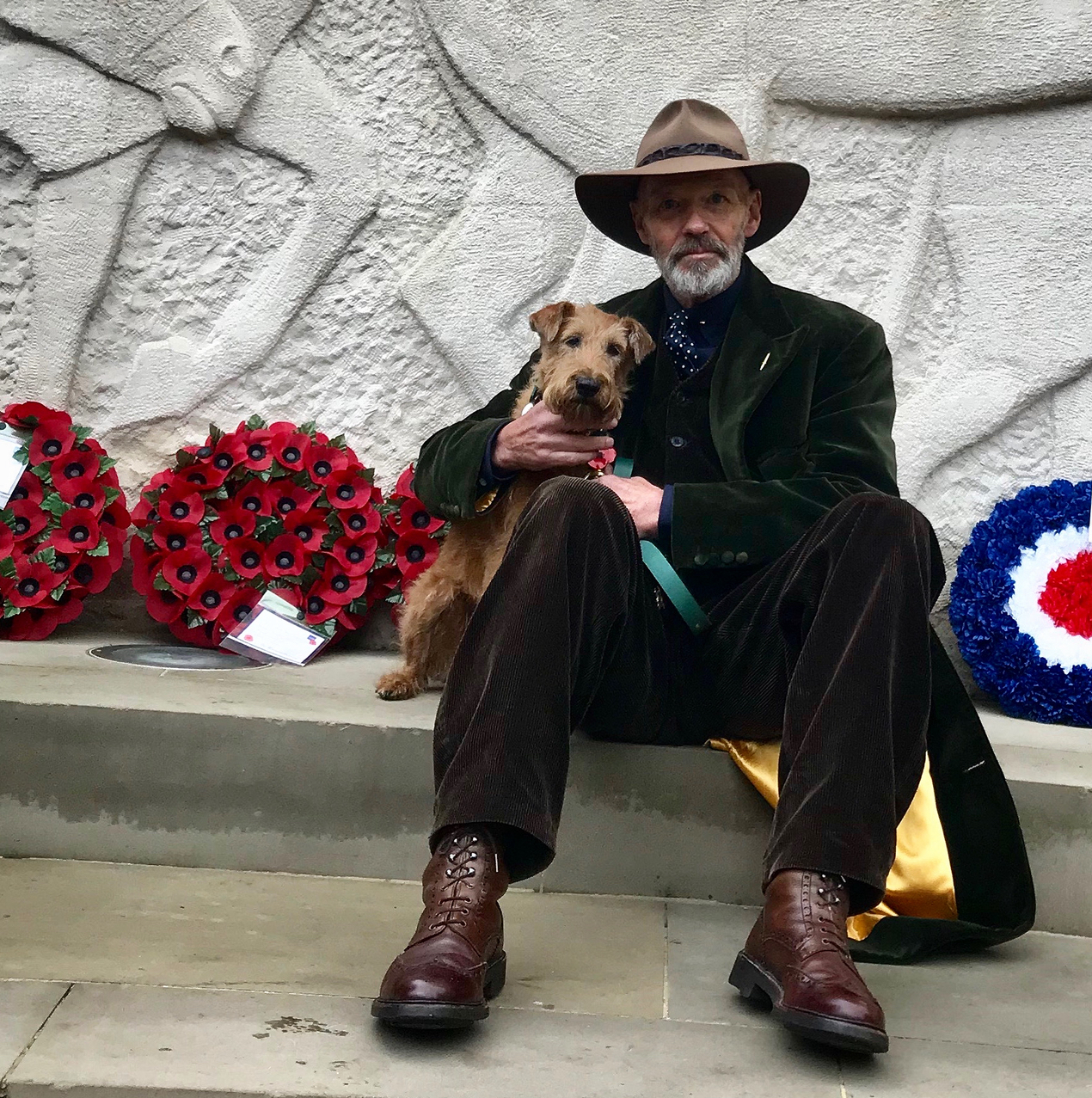
Chris Terrill with his Irish Terrier Molly at the Animal War Memorial

Terrill is a lifelong Humanist. Describing himself as an agnostic atheist and anti-theist he is an active member of Humanists UK for which he is a secular pastoral carer and school speaker. Despite his personal non religious philosophy he is keen to build bridges between secular and religious communities by stressing all that they have in common rather than what divides them.

A committed vegan, he is also an advocate and activist for animal rights.

== Books Published ==
Year	Title	Publisher	Synopsis
1995	HMS Brilliant	BBC Books	The book describes the events that took place on HMS Brilliant, a Royal Navy frigate on front line duty in the Adriatic during the Yugoslavian war as part of Operation Sharp Guard.
2005	Shipmates	Century Random House	An exploration of the Royal Navy's heritage and its role in the modern world.
2007	Commando	Century Random House	Chris Terrill's experience of training with the elite Royal Marines Commandos and winning his own green beret before following them to the front line in Afghanistan.
2008	Commando (paperback)	Arrow Books Random House	Released as paperback – expanded with updates and epilogue
2022	How to Build an Aircraft Carrier	Penguin Random House	HMS Queen Elizabeth. The extraordinary story of the men and women who first breathed life in to Britain's biggest warship.

== Filmography ==
Year	Title	Broadcaster	Summary/Series titles
1989	Subway: Inside Story	BBC1	Crime and violence on the London Underground
1990	Bullies: 40 Minutes	BBC2	The chronic problem of school bullying
1990	The Race Game: Inside Story	BBC1	An investigation into racism in British sport with particular focus on athletics, cricket and football.
1990	Fit To Drop: 40 Minutes	BBC2	The extraordinary story of people addicted to exercise.
1991	Brief Encounters: 40 Minutes	BBC2	Prostitutes, pimps, punters and the police at Kings Cross Railway Station
1992	Ape Trade: Inside Story Special	BBC1/National Geographic	Undercover investigation into international orangutan smuggling from Borneo (Kalimantan) to Taiwan, the former Yugoslavia, Russia, Germany and the USA.
1993	Yellow Line: Inside Story	BBC1	The vicious parking wars on the streets of London
1993	Miami Wild: 40 Minutes	BBC2	Policing the animal smuggling trade in Florida
1994	Seeing Red: Inside Story	BBC1	Union unrest, crime and violence on London's buses
1994	The Women Trade: Inside Story Special	BBC1	Undercover investigation into international prostitution and the marketing of women for the sex industry from Eastern Europe, the Far East, the Caribbean (Dominican Republic), South America to Europe (Rotterdam and Amsterdam)
1995	Beloved Country (series)	BBC2	6 part series on ordinary South African lives as the country approached full democracy and black rule 1: Township Tango: Crime and political violence meets ballroom dancing in Soweto 2: Black Men Bite: Rugby goes multi racial in the Eastern Province 3: Wild Boer: The white dispossessed of Richard's Bay, Natal 4: The She Chief: The first female chief in Zululand 5: Joseph: Black entrepreneurship in Pretoria (Dir' Dan Reed) 6: Cape Fear: Drugs and gang-life on the Cape Flats, Capetown (Dir' Dan Reed)
1996	HMS Brilliant (series)	BBC1	6 part series on a Royal Navy warship serving during the Yugoslavian war.: 1. A Little Bit of England: Heading out to the war; 2. Watchman Nine Zero: On patrol off Serbia; 3. Mickey Gets a Massage: Riotous run ashore in Istanbul; 4. Gladys Takes the Rapp: Courts Martial at sea; 5. Rocking the Boat: Women sailors fight back; 6. Homeward Bounders: Heading home
1996	Alison's Last Mountain: Inside Story Special	BBC1	Journey to K2 with the family of Alison Hargreaves soon after her death on the mountain
1997	Soho Stories (series)	BBC2	12 part series about life in London's famous and flamboyant Soho district: 1. Passport to Soho: Introduction to the weird and wonderful world of Soho; 2. Icing on the Cake: Quantum physics student Gwen takes up a summer holiday job as a stripper; 3. Hot Couture: Mark Powell – tailor to the rich, famous and one or two ne'er do wells; 4. Love for Sale: Prostitutes and madams rule the roost; 5. Eternal Light: The last synagogue in Soho closes; 6. Queen for a day: Gay Pride day and Danny searches his soul and his sexuality; 7. Rising Passion: Troy Passion – male stripper extroadinaire goes for broke; 8. Fortress West One: Euro 96 comes to Soho – violently and the police are stretched to their limit; 9. High Noon: England fans confront German fans in Soho and go 'gay bashing'; 10. Heavy French Accent: Michelle celebrates Bastille Day by baring her breasts in public whist Troy Passion tours the south of France; 11. Brush with the Law: Mark Powell ends up in Pentonville Prison while Chris paints his portrait in absentia; 12. A Fitting End: Mark is released from prison in time for his West End fashion show
1998	The Cruise (series)	BBC1	12 part series on board a luxury cruise ship in the Caribbean featuring Jane McDonald: 1. Let the Dream Begin: Jane arrives on the Galaxy to start work on the Caribbean cruise.; 2. Stranded in Paradise: The ship arrives in Jamaica for Christmas.; 3. Scotty to the Rescue: New Year's Eve on the Galaxy.; 4. Life's a Beach: Jane and DJ Scotty climb a waterfall.; 5. Double or Quits: Following croupiers Dale and Mary in the ship's casino.; 6. Stormin' Norman: Passenger and professional gambler Norman has an argument with the ship's casino, while Dale and Mary go jet-skiing.; 7. Break a Leg: Lead dancer Philip has a fall. Jane visits a medium in Key West. Dale and Mary go roller-blading to celebrate their wedding anniversary.; 8. Dancing with Dolphins: Dancers Jack and Michelle swim with dolphins.; 9. Lights, Camera, Action: Dale and Mary go on a rafting trip. Jane gets a makeover. Michele attends a dress rehearsal.; 10. First Night Nerves: The ship's new entertainment show opens.; 11. Le Grand Buffet: Sean the juggler confronts 300 born-again Christians.; 12. Teach Me Tonight: Laura marries Gary at the ship's disco.
1998	Jane Ties the Knot	BBC1	Cruise special—Jane gets married on a Caribbean Island.
1999	Jane's Cruise to the Stars	BBC1	Cruise special—Jane's rise to stardom.
1999	Jailbirds (series)	BBC1	10 part series inside Newhall Women's high security prison: 1. Through the Gates: A new intake of prisoners arrives at Newhall Prison; 2. Inside Out: Toni, a heroin addict, comes to terms with life in jail; 3. Doing the Rattle: Toni suffers serious withdrawal and tries to hang herself; 4. Sugar and Spice: Melissa arrives and tries to contact her mum; 5. Naughty Ladies: Some of the long serving prisoners advise the newcomers about prison life; 6. Six months Gone: A new prisoner confides that she is six months pregnant; 7. Four Leaf Clover: Ivy, 71 years old, gets to grips with prison and the young generation of girls around her; 8. Cutting Up: Star, a long serving prisoner, self harms and needs urgent treatment.; 9. Guilt Trip: Melissa's mum and dad come to visit her in prison for the first time; 10. If: Ivy organises a poetry club and recites Kipling's 'If' by heart
2000	Beyond the Bars	BBC1	Jailbirds special—What happened to the prisoners after release.
2000	Tito's Story	BBC1	Inside Story special on an 11-year-old autistic boy in India who writes beautiful philosophical poetry
2000	The Quest	BBC1	The story of a rock gospel band and their bid for fame
2001	Through the Eyes of the Old	BBC1	90-minute feature documentary on being old
2001	Through the Eyes of the Young	BBC1	90-minute feature documentary on being young
2002	The Ship (series)	BBC2/History Channel	6 part adventure series sailing the Endeavour in the wake of Captain Cook from Australia to Indonesia
2003	Shayler's Secrets	BBC2	Following the rogue spy David Shayler through his fateful trial at the Old Bailey
2004	Charlotte Church—Spreading Her Wings	BBC1	A year in the life of the young diva as she approaches her 18th birthday
2004	The Making of Sheila Quigley	BBC1	The extraordinary story of a first time novelist
2004	Debra Winger in Africa	Charity film/Sightsavers International	Film for Sightsavers International about Debra Winger visiting Kenya to highlight the plight of the blind
2004	The 24 Hour Plays	Charity film/New Voices	Film for the Old Vic New Voices programme about a unique theatrical experiment
2005	Charlotte Church—Confessions of a Teen Angel	ITV1	Charlotte attempting to break into the rock world
2004–2005	Shipmates (series)	BBC1	A major 5 part series about the Royal Navy on operations.: 1. Hello-Goodbye: Devonport Naval Base where we meet the men and women of HMS Chatham as well as the recruits at HMS Raleigh; 2. After the Wave: HMS Chatham leaves for the Gulf but ends up in Sri Lanka after the boxing day tsunami destroys most of the east coast; 3. Heads Up, Chests Out, Be Proud: The Devonport team prepare for the Field Gun Championships; 4. Raising the Dead: Exorcists are called in to Devonport dockyard whilst HMS Chatham calls in to Alexandria to bury some of Nelson's sailors killed in the Battle of the Nile but only recently discovered; 5. Theatre of War: Warships and Fleet Air Arm planes gather for a massive military exercise in the English Channel
2006	Debra Winger in India	Charity film/Sightsavers International	A film for Sightsavers International about Debra Winger visiting India to highlight the plight of the blind
2006	The Sultan and the Elephant	BBC Four	The heart-warming story of a giant elephant's visit to the streets of London and the enchantment he brought with him.
2006	Extreme Theatre	Sky TV	A one-hour special on a unique theatrical experiment at the Old Vic featuring Kevin Spacey
2007	Commando: On the Front Line (series)	ITV1	8 part series on the training of Royal Marines Commandos for active service on the front line in Afghanistan: 1. The Shock of Capture: New recruits (924 Troop) arrive at the Commando Training Base at Lympstone; 2. Carrot and Stick: 924 Troop are 'encouraged' to train to the limit of their physical and mental energies; 3. The Lost Patrol: 924 Troop get lost on Dartmoor; 4. Tears and Fears: Several recruits fall by the wayside and have to leave Lympstone; 5. Enemy Contact: Young officers arrive in Afghanistan and go straight to the front line; 6. Operation Sparrowhawk: A major operation to confront the Taliban head on; 7. Assault at Dawn: A daring assault on an enemy stronghold.; 8. Royal Marines – To Your duties!: The recruits from 924 Troop pass out and head for Afghanistan
2007	The 55 Year Old Commando	ITV1 and 4	The story of Chris Terrill's attempt to win the iconic green beret of the Royal Marines Commando (directed by Malcolm Donkin)
2007	Commando: On the Front Line (Director's cut) (series)	ITV4	8 part series as above—one hour versions
2007	The Parish Church of England—St Martin-in-the-Fields (series)	Five	3-part series on a year in the life of this iconic church in Trafalgar Square: 1. The Pilgrimage: The annual pilgrimage from St Martin-in-the-Fields to Canterbury Cathedral; 2. Christmas Spirit: Looking after the homeless of the West End on Christmas Day; 3. Renewal: Rebuilding the church and excavating the grounds to discover an ancient burial site plus hosting gay pride
2007	Go Commando!	ITV4	Two Royal Marines row the Atlantic Ocean
2008	Nature's Fury (series)	ITV1	3 part series on the world's most destructive storms and their impact on communities: 1. Tornado: Expedition through America's Tornado Alley from Texas to Nebraska and from Kansas to Mississippi in search of Super Storms and killer tornados; 2. Hurricane: Following Hurricane Ike's destructive track across the Caribbean and the southern states of the US and then waiting for him to strike in Galveston, Texas; 3. Firestorm: Tackling the wild fires in southern California with a crack fire fighting team made up entirely of hard core criminals
2009	Theatreland (series)	Sky Arts	8 part series behind the scenes at the famous Theatre Royal, Haymarket featuring Ian McKellen, Patrick Stewart, Ronald Pickup, Simon Callow and Anna Friel.: 1. Bringing the House Down: First glimpse behind the scenes at the Haymarket as rehearsals start for Waiting For Godot; 2. OK, Now Entertain Us!: The backstage crew start to build the set as rehearsals ramp up; 3. Flushed with Success: Ian McKellen and Patrick Stewart prepare for their first night – meanwhile the theatre toilets need re grouting!; 4. Is there a Spectre in the House?: Patrick Stewart sees a ghost on stage; 5. Waiting in the Wings: Patrick Stewart falls ill. With only one rehearsal the understudy must go on; 6. Goodbye Godot: The last night of a three-month run and Ian McKellen becomes emotional; 7. Blond or Brunette: Anna Friel rehearses for Breakfast at Tiffany's but can't decide what colour her hair should be; 8. Blood, Sweat and Magic: The end of a smash hit season at the Theatre Royal, Haymarket
2010	War Torn Warriors (series)	Sky 1	Two 60 minute films about badly injured Royal Marines trekking and climbing in the high Himalayas: 1. Fighting Back: An expedition comprising fifty badly injured Royal Marines and sailors sets off for the high Himalayas and Everest base camp; 2. A Mountain to Climb: A hardy group of war wounded marines attempt to summit Labouche East – a towering 6,000 metre peak adjacent to Everest
2011	Royal Navy: Caribbean Patrol (series)	Five/National Geographic	5 part series about the Royal Navy tracking down cocaine smugglers and providing humanitarian relief after hurricane strikes in the Caribbean.: 1. Bad Guys Dead Ahead: HMS Manchester heads out to the Caribbean for a six month deployment in pursuit of cocaine smugglers; 2. Old Lady of the Seas: The ageing destroyer struggles with machinery and engine breakdowns; 3. In the Dead of Night: Cocaine smugglers are tracked and intercepted near the coast of Colombia; 4. High Winds and Savage Seas: The hurricane season draws close and HMS Manchester braces herself for the full impact; 5. Mission of Mercy: HMS Manchester moves fast to bring urgent help to the island of St Lucia smashed by a deadly hurricane
2011	Nature's Fury—Monsoon	ITV4	Facing up to the extremes of the Indian monsoon from Mumbai to Rajasthan and from Delhi to Kolkota.
2012	Royal Marines: Mission Afghanistan (series)	Five	6 part series on the Royal Marines of 42 Commando working in the Nad e Ali North district of Helmand Province known at the time as "the most dangerous square mile in the world": 1. Deadly Underfoot: Lima Company, 42 Commando arrives at Toki patrol base in the heart of Taliban country; 2. Venus Fly Trap: A Lima Company patrol sets a deadly ambush for the insurgents; 3. Dogs of War: Memphis the bomb sniffing spaniel arrives on the front line with Mick – his RAF handler; 4. Kill or Capture: Taff – a tough sergeant from the Valleys – leads his patrol across enemy territory; 5. Brothers in Arms: The injured commandos return home to their loved ones; 6. The Final Reckoning: Taking stock of what Lima company achieved in their long and bloody tour of duty?
2012	Theatre of War	BBC1	Theatre presents War in a unique and remarkable way for a feature-length Imagine Special
2013	Battle Scarred (series)	Five	4 part series on the problems faced by ex-servicemen when returning to civilian life.: 1. Nightmare on Civvy Street: Facing up to the transition of returning to civilian life; 2. Soldiers Behind Bars: Ex military personnel ending up in the criminal justice system; 3. Soldiering On: Dealing with Post Trauma Stress Disorder; 4. The Final Reckoning: Confronting grief and facing up to the loss of comrades
2013	Living on the Edge – Blood in the Snow (series)	Five	Following the great reindeer migration across northern Norway with the Sami nomads – the oldest living culture in Europe
2013	Living on the Edge – Blood in the Sand (series)	Five	A journey across the drought belt of Africa from Mali to northern Kenya and into war ravaged Somalia
2014	Living on the Edge – Blood in the Sea (series)	Five	Fishing with the Senegalese and Mauritanian fishermen in the dangerous waters off the west coast of Africa.
2014	Marine 'A': Criminal or Casualty of War?	BBC1	A personal exploration into the ethical and moral issues of a battle field execution.
2014	Commando: Return to the Front Line	ITV1	A one-hour special updating the story of Commando: On the Front Line. The film follows Bertie Kerr back to Afghanistan to assess the legacy of a war that cost over 450 British lives.
2014	The Commando Who Refused to Die	Forces TV	The moving and inspiring story of Corporal Paul Vice MC who suffered horrific life changing injuries after being blown up in Afghanistan but who then reinvented his life in the most extraordinary way.
2015	Return to the Jungle	Forces TV	Veterans from the Parachute Regiment return to Borneo for the 50th anniversary of the Battle of Plaman Mapu. In 1965 36 Paras held out against 400 troops of the Indonesian special forces in a desperate battle described as "a latter day Rorke's Drift".
2015	Royal Marine WAGs and The Great Yomp	Forces TV	Royal Marines wives and girlfriends – The Bootneckettes – attempt the Great Yomp: 104 miles over the South Downs Way in 36 hours non stop! Giant blisters are the least of their problems.
2016–2018	Britain's Biggest Warship (series)	BBC2/Smithsonian Channel USA	3-part series. The epic story of HMS Queen Elizabeth – the biggest warship ever built for the Royal Navy. From first day of build to maiden voyage this will be the story of a state of the art warship, the people who built her, the people who will sail her and also the people who will fly off her.: 1. Crewing Up: Preparing HMS Queen Elizabeth for sea is more of a challenge than expected; 2. In at the Deep end: Gruelling sea trials push ship and crew to their limits; 3. Out With The Old and In With The New: The final stages of sea trials breaks the heart of Bob Hawkins
2018	Rise of the Supercarrier	Smithsonian Channel USA	3 part series. US reversion of Britain's Biggest Warship for American broadcast.: 1. Birth of a Giant: Construction and preparation for sea trials; 2. Do or Die: Six weeks on the high seas; 3. Trials at Sea: Heading home
2017–2018	To Hell and Back	Forces TV	The story of an heroic attempt by eight Royal Marines to break the world speed marching record – a full marathon running as a troop in full fighting order, wearing combat boots and carrying 40lbs rucksack plus weapon. A moving tale of determination, courage and comradeship.
2017	Marine A: The Inside Story (Panorama)	BBC1	A Panorama Special on the Marine A murder case
2017–2018	Wildlife Warriors	Forces TV	Former British soldiers confront the rhino poachers in South Africa
2018–2019	Britain's Biggest Warship Goes to Sea (series 2)	BBC2/Smithsonian Channel USA	The ongoing story of HMS Queen Elizabeth: 1. Let Go All Lines: First trans Atlantic voyage; 2. Don't Feed the Birds: F35B Stealth Fighter lands on the flight deck for the first time; 3. Manhattan Ahoy: Spectacular visit to the Big Apple
2019–2021	The Last Mountain	BBC/Universal	Feature documentary on Tom and Kate Ballard – mountaineering siblings extraordinaire.
2023	The Warship: Tour of Duty	BBC2	Major 6 part series about HMS Queen Elizabeth's first operational deployment to the South China Sea: 1. For Queen and Country: Departing Portsmouth the Royal Navy's flagship spearheads a task force of ten ships; 2. Troubled Waters: The Russians react to the British task group; 3. The Enemy Within: The ship's company contends with a major medical emergency that affects every man and woman on board; 4. Pride of the Fleet: HMS Queen Elizabeth reaches the South China Sea; 5: Neptune's Kingdom: HMS Queen Elizabeth crosses the equator in surprising fashion 6: It's not Over till it's Over: The vast aircraft carrier heads for home but her adventures are not over yet
2023–2024	SNT	ITV	Behind the scenes special of Saturday Night Takeaway with Ant and Dec
2023–2024	Keep off the Grass	BBC and world distribution (through Whisper Films)	The behind the scene story of the Wimbledon Tennis Championships

== Honours, awards and nominations ==
=== Honours ===
Year	Organisation/Body	Honour	Reason
2007	Corps of His Majesty's Royal Marines	Honorary Royal Marines Commando	For close association with the Corps and in recognition of being only civilian and oldest person to win a green beret on merit.
2015	Maritime Foundation	Maritime Fellowship (see below)	Lifetime Achievement.
2018	Durham University	Honorary Doctorate of Science	Pioneering work in anthropology and filmmaking.
2025	Bootnecks into Business	Special Award	Lifetime Achievement presented by Al Carns Minister for Armed Forces

=== Awards ===
Year	Type	Film/television series	Broadcaster	Category
1992	Emmy	Ape Trade.	BBC/National Geographic	Outstanding Investigative Journalism
1996	Broadcast Award	HMS Brilliant	BBC1	Best producer/director
1997	Royal Television Society Award	Soho Stories	BBC2	Innovation
2003	Emma (Ethnic and Multicultural Media Award)	Tito's Story	BBC1	Best Documentary
2008	Royal Marines Historical Society	Commando on the Front Line	ITV	Best Documentary Series
2014	Clarion Award (for ethical journalism)	Marine A: Criminal or Casualty of War?	BBC1	Best Current Affairs Documentary
2015	The Maritime Fellowship Award (Special Distinction)	A twenty year body of work relating to maritime issues associated with the Royal Navy and the Royal Marines	TV (all channels), radio and the written word.	Lifetime Achievement Award
2020	Maritime Media Donald Gosling Award	Britain's Biggest Warship Goes to Sea	BBC2	Best Film or TV Production
2022	Trento Film Festival, Italy: Audience Award	The Last Mountain	Universal Pictures/BBC	Best Mountaineering Film
2022	Chamonix Film Festival, France: Prix de la Narration	The Last Mountain	Universal Pictures/BBC	Best Told Story
2022	Festival du Film Alpin, Switzerland: Le Grand Prix	The Last Mountain	Universal Pictures/BBC	Best Film
2022	Festival Gorski Poland	The Last Mountain	Universal Pictures/BBC	Best Mountaineering Film
2022	Krakow Mountain Film Festival: Le Grand Prix	The Last Mountain	Universal Pictures/BBC	Best Mountaineering Film
2023	Vancouver Mountain Film Festival	The Last Mountain	Universal Pictures/BBC	Best Adventure Film
2023	Czechia International Mountain Film Festival: Grand Prix	The Last Mountain	Universal Pictures/BBC	Best Overall Film
2025	Warsaw Festival Filmowy	The Last Mountain	Universal Pictures/BBC	Best Film

=== Nominations ===
Year	Type	Film/television series	Broadcaster	Category
1997	BAFTA (Craft Awards)	Soho Stories	BBC2	Best Sound
1998	National TV Awards	The Cruise	BBC1	Best Factual Entertainment Series
2002	BAFTA	Through the Eyes of the Old	BBC1	Best Single Documentary
2002	Grierson	Through the Eyes of the Old	BBC1	Best Documentary on a Contemporary Theme
2003	Emmy	The Ship	BBC2/History Channel	Cinematography
2003	Education on TV Awards	The Ship	BBC2/History Channel	Best History Documentary Series *Highly recommended
2004	Maritime Media Awards	Shipmates	BBC1	Best Documentary Series
2010	Mental Health Media Awards	War Torn Warriors	Sky 1	Best Documentary
2011	Maritime Media Awards	Royal Navy: Caribbean Patrol	Channel Five	Best Documentary Series
2013	Grierson British Documentary Awards	Theatre of War	BBC 1	Best Arts Documentary
2015	Maritime Media Awards	Blood in the Sea	Channel Five	Best Documentary Film
2018	Maritime Media Awards	Britain's Biggest warship	BBC 2	Best Documentary Film
2022	Grierson British Documentary Awards	The Last Mountain	BBC/Universal	Best Sports Documentary
2022	Grierson British Documentary Awards	The Last Mountain	BBC/Universal	Best Documentary Film

== Public Service Interests ==
Charity	Cause	Year	Position
Help Our Wounded	In support of wounded, injured and sick Royal Marines	2008 – present	Patron
Forward Assist	Helping ex soldiers back on their feet	2009 – present	Patron
Royal Marine Trust Fund	Support for marines and former marines in need	2010 – present	Ambassador
Orlando Rogers Foundation	Support for underprivileged young people to pursue adventure	2010 – present	Trustee
Veterans for Wildlife	Supporting former military personnel in the protection of endangered species	2015 – present	volunteer filmmaker
Commando 999	In support of Royal Marines charities	2015–2017	Trustee
Bravo 22	Theatre as rehabilitation for injured military personnel	2010 – present	volunteer filmmaker
Old Vic New Voices	Helping to find and promote new, young theatrical talent from the community	2002–2012	volunteer filmmaker
Royal Navy Royal Marines Charity	In support of the Royal Navy and Royal Marines (serving and veterans)	appointed 2023	Ambassador
