= The Cruise (1998 TV series) =

BBC fly-on-the-wall documentary series

- Title screen
- Starring: Jane McDonald
- Country of origin: United Kingdom
- Original language: English
- No. of series: 1
- No. of episodes: 12 (+ 2 specials)

Production
- Producers: Chris Terrill; Olivia Lichtenstein
- Running time: 30 minutes

Original release
- Network: BBC One
- Release: 13 January – 31 December 1998

The Cruise is a British observational documentary television series directed by Chris Terrill that aired on BBC One in 1998. The series of 12 episodes followed a group of staff on board the luxury cruise ship Galaxy as it sailed the Caribbean on its maiden voyage. The first episode, "Let the Dream Begin", aired at 8pm on 13 January 1998. The series was highly popular, attracting 10.39 million viewers (41 per cent audience share). It made a celebrity of Jane McDonald, a cruise ship entertainer on Galaxy, who went on to become a recording artist and television presenter.

== Episodes ==
#	Title	Synopsis	Date
1	"Let the Dream Begin"	Introduction.	13 January 1998
2	"Stranded in Paradise"	The ship arrives in Jamaica for Christmas.	14 January 1998
3	"Scotty to the Rescue"	New Year's Eve.	20 January 1998
4	"Life's a Beach"	Jane and DJ Scotty climb a waterfall.	21 January 1998
5	"Double or Quits"	Following croupiers Dale and Mary in the ship's casino.	27 January 1998
6	"Stormin' Norman"	Passenger and professional gambler Norman has an argument with the ship's casino, while Dale and Mary go jet-skiing.	28 January 1998
7	"Break a Leg"	Lead dancer Philip has a fall. Jane visits a medium. Dale and Mary go roller-blading to celebrate their wedding anniversary.	3 February 1998
8	"Dancing with Dolphins"	Dancers Jake and Michele swim with dolphins.	4 February 1998
9	"Lights, Camera, Action"	Dale and Mary go on a rafting trip. Jane gets a makeover. Michele attends a dress rehearsal.	10 February 1998
10	"First Night Nerves"	The ship's new entertainment show opens.	11 February 1998
11	"Le Grand Buffet"	Sean the juggler confronts 300 born-again Christians.	17 February 1998
12	"Teach Me Tonight"	Laura marries Gary at the ship's disco.	18 February 1998

=== Specials ===
Title	Synopsis	Date
The Cruise Special: Jane Ties the Knot	Jane marries her Danish boyfriend Henrik on the Caribbean island of St Thomas.	10 July 1998
Jane's Cruise to the Stars	Reflecting on Jane's year in the spotlight, with previously unseen footage from The Cruise.	31 December 1998

== Return to... The Cruise ==
In August 2008, BBC Two broadcast a five-part series called Return to... The Cruise, a retrospective look at the original series, with stars of The Cruise reminiscing about life on board Galaxy, as well as highlights from the series.
