= HMS Endeavour replica =

Australian replica sailing vessel

HMB (Bark) Endeavour replica
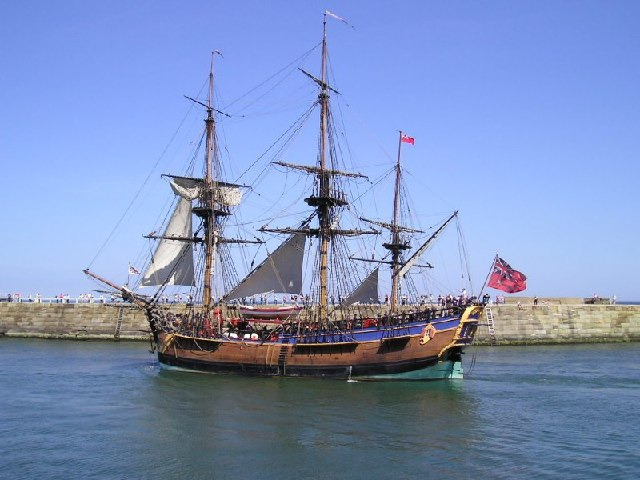
- The Australian replica of HMS Endeavour sailing from Whitby Harbour in June 2000

History

Australia
- Name: HMS Endeavour
- Owner: HM Bark Endeavour Foundation (1991–2005); Australian National Maritime Museum (2005–present)
- Laid down: October 1988
- Launched: 9 December 1993
- Completed: 16 April 1994
- Home port: Australian National Maritime Museum, Sydney
- Identification: IMO number: 8644967; MMSI number: 503094000; Callsign: VNJC
- Status: Active as of 2012
- Notes: Replica of the original HMS Endeavour

General characteristics
- Type: Bark, museum ship
- Length: 43.6 m (143 ft), bowsprit to stern
- Beam: 9.28 m (30.4 ft)
- Height: 28 m (92 ft) mainmast
- Draught: 3.4 m (11 ft)
- Propulsion: Auxiliary: 2 × Caterpillar 3046 B diesels; 404 hp (301 kW)
- Sail plan: 3 Masted Ship; 25 duradon sails; Sail area: 1,461 to 1,511 square metres (15,730 to 16,260 sq ft)

HMB Endeavour replica is a replica of HMS Endeavour, the bark commanded by Lieutenant James Cook when he charted New Zealand and the eastern coast of Australia.

The initial idea of recreating Endeavour for use as a museum ship was born during the establishment of the Australian National Maritime Museum in the 1980s; the vessel was to be funded by the Bond Corporation and gifted to the nation upon completion. A specialist shipyard was established, complete with viewing platform and guided tours for the public, and construction of the vessel commenced in 1988. Two years later, work stopped because the Bond Corporation hit financial trouble; the Japanese company Yoshiya Corporation stepped in but was also forced to withdraw support because of financial problems.

Volunteers maintained the incomplete vessel until the HM Bark Endeavour Foundation was established as a charitable trust in 1991. The Endeavour replica was launched at the end of 1993 and completed in 1994. After sea trials, the replica sailed from Fremantle to Sydney where she arrived at the end of 1994. During 1995, the ship recreated Cook's voyage along eastern Australia, then visited New Zealand at the end of the year. In late 1996, the Endeavour replica set out on a circumnavigation of the world, visiting ports in South Africa, the United Kingdom, and America before returning to New Zealand in late 1999. The vessel returned to Sydney in mid-2000. In 2001, the replica was used for filming of the BBC documentary The Ship, then sailed to England in 2002. She spent the next two years visiting ports in the United Kingdom and Europe before sailing back to Sydney in 2005, completing a second round-the-world voyage. On arrival in Australia, the HM Bark Endeavour Foundation transferred ownership of the vessel to the Australian National Maritime Museum. During 2011 and 2012, the replica circumnavigated Australia.

== Construction ==
The idea of building a replica of Endeavour was first mooted by the trustees of the under-construction Australian National Maritime Museum. The vessel would serve as the centrepiece of the museum ship fleet. Funding for construction was provided by the Bond Corporation, with the completed replica to be presented as the company's gift to Australia for the nation's bicentenary. Construction was organised through a subsidiary company, Endeavour Replica Pty Ltd. A specialist shipyard was established at Fremantle Fishing Boat Harbour; a viewing gallery allowed visitors to observe the replica's construction, and volunteer guides ran tours through the shipyard. Recreation of the vessel was not problematic, as the original Endeavour had been surveyed multiple times by the Royal Navy, particularly during her conversion from a cargo collier to a ship of exploration, and these records had been retained by the British National Maritime Museum.

Construction of the vessel started in January 1988, with the keel laid in October. In 1990, Bond Corporation was forced to stop work on the project because of financial difficulties. The Japanese Yoshiya Corporation joined the project, but withdrew six months later, again because of financial problems. The volunteer complement were able to keep the shipyard ticking over for another eight months. In order to complete and operate the vessel, the HM Bark Endeavour Foundation was set up as a charitable trust in August 1991, with the Bond and Yoshiya Corporations donating their equity in the project. A combination of funding from the Australian government, loans, and donations allowed work on the ship to continue. The Endeavour replica was launched on 9 December 1993, and completed on 16 April 1994.

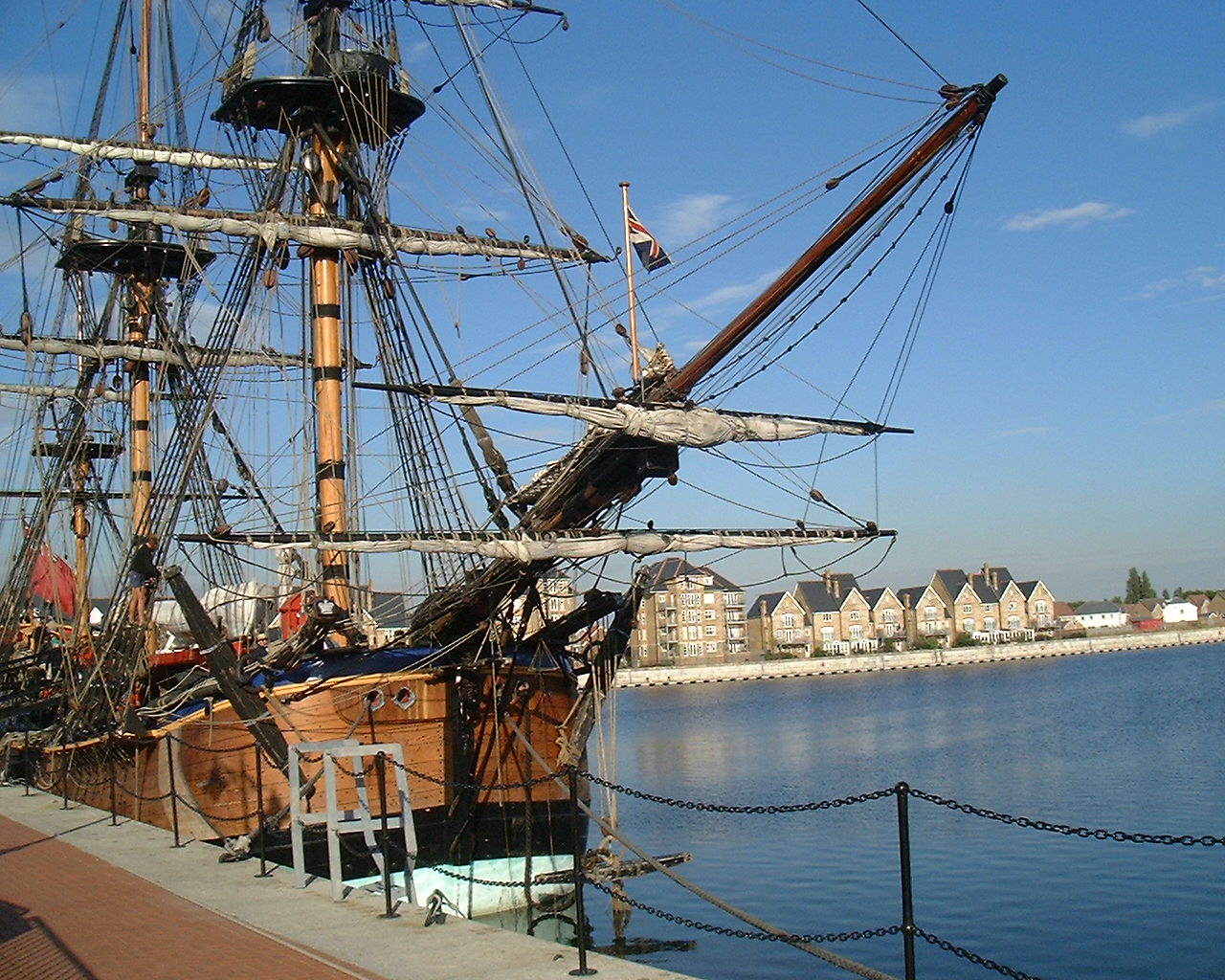
Closeup of the replica's bow, showing the two (furled) spritsails

The Endeavour replica was assembled using traditional shipbuilding methods and materials where possible, although some changes were made to meet modern safety standards and enhance the longevity of the replica. The vessel's hull is built from jarrah, with Oregon pine also used above the waterline: although oak and elm were used in the original ship, the decision was made not to use these as they were more susceptible to rotting. Although some of the wood was fresh-cut, much of it was salvaged from demolished buildings and bridges, or taken from trees felled during construction work or storms. The Endeavour replica is square-rigged with 25 sails made from "Duradon" (a brand of polyester rot- and water-resistant sailcloth), giving a sail area of between 1,461 and 1,511 square metres (15,730 and 16,260 sq ft), including 531 square metres (5,720 sq ft) of studding sails. The ship is 43.6 metres (143 ft) long from bowsprit to stern, has a beam of 9.28 metres (30.4 ft), a draught of 3.4 metres (11 ft), and a mainmast height of 28 metres (92 ft). Auxiliary propulsion is provided by two Caterpillar 3046 B diesel engines, which provide 404 horsepower (301 kW). Most of the "20th century" equipment, including the diesel engines, a powered galley, and navigational equipment, is sited in what was the hold on the original Endeavour, keeping the upper decks in their 18th-century condition.

== Operational history ==
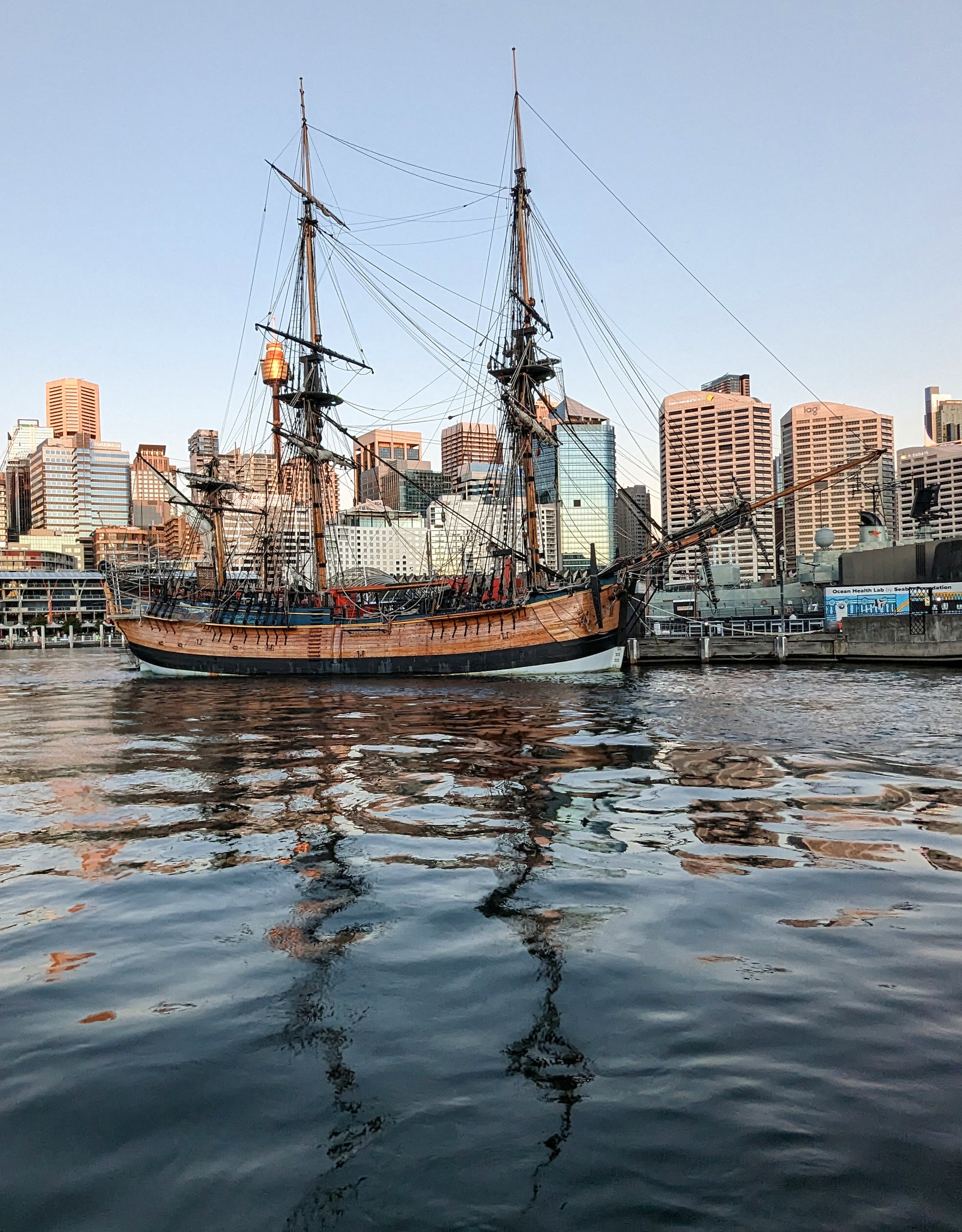
The Endeavour replica at the Australian National Maritime Museum in Sydney

The Endeavour replica spent six months undergoing sea trials and operating around Fremantle before sailing around southern Australia to Sydney. Departing in October, the ship made numerous port visits along the southern and eastern coasts before arriving in December. She was placed on display at the Australian National Maritime Museum.

From April until September 1995, the replica recreated the original Endeavour's voyage up the east coast of Australia, then made a three-month visit to New Zealand from November 1995 to January 1996. After this, the ship returned to Fremantle via ports in Victoria and South Australia. In October 1996, the replica sailed for England via South Africa, arriving in March 1997. After spending the rest of the year visiting British ports, the ship arrived in Florida in March 1998, and visited 31 ports along both the east and west coasts of North America during 1998 and 1999. The Endeavour replica sailed from Vancouver to New Zealand via Hawaii, and reached Wellington in late December 1999, having circumnavigated the globe. The ship spent five months in New Zealand waters before sailing to Sydney in May 2000.

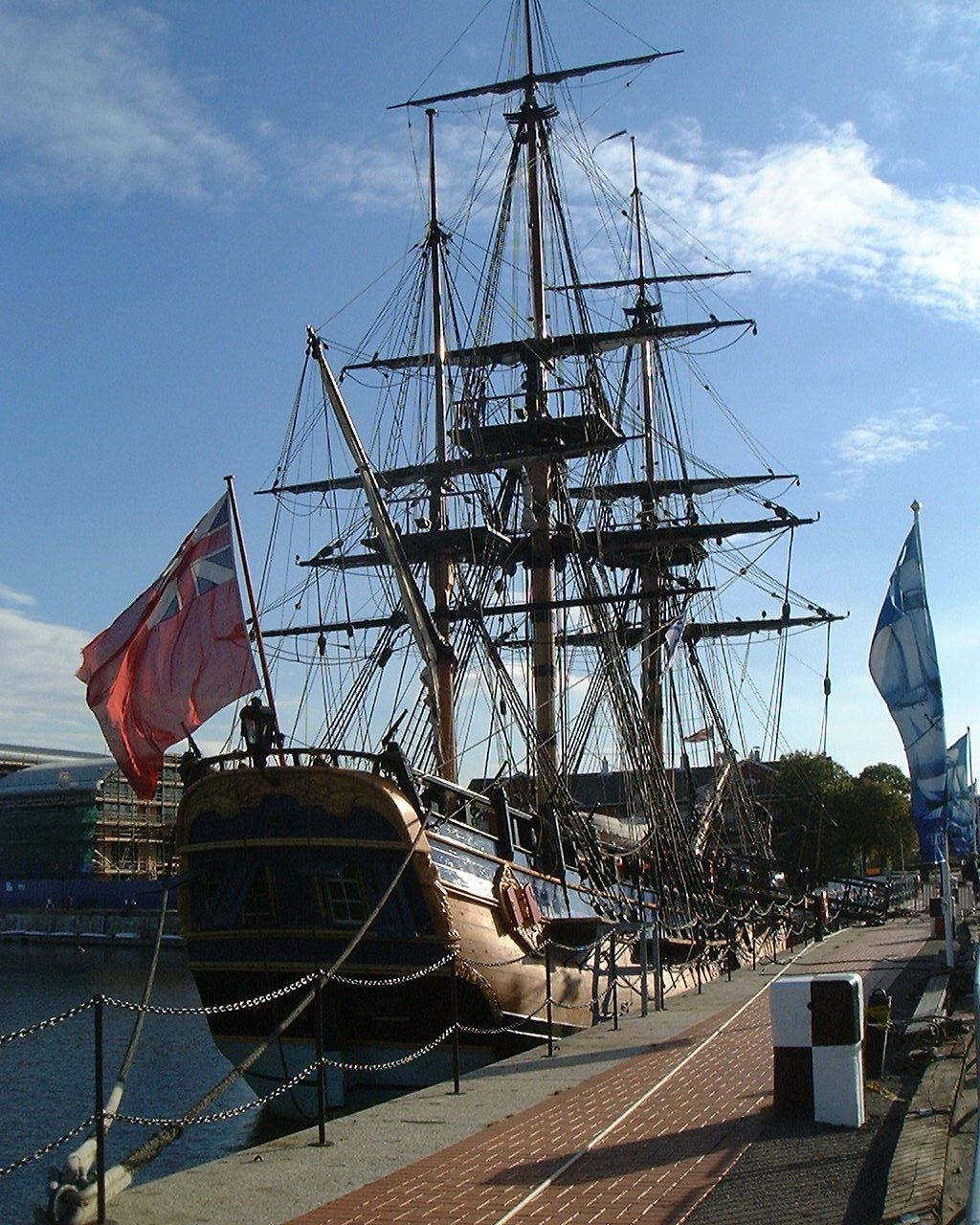
The Endeavour replica on display at Chatham Dockyard, England, in September 2003

During 2001, Endeavour embarked a BBC film crew and recreated Cook's voyage between Cairns and Jakarta for filming of the documentary series The Ship. After a major refit in Fremantle during late 2001 and early 2002, the replica sailed in February for a second round-the-world voyage. The ship sailed to Whitby via Cape Horn; wave footage shot while rounding the cape was later used for digitally composited scenes in the 2003 film Master and Commander: The Far Side of the World. She spent most of the next two years on display, either in Whitby, or during visits to ports in the United Kingdom and Europe.

The replica left England in 2004, and returned to Australia via the Caribbean, Panama Canal, Galapagos, Tahiti, and New Zealand. She reached Sydney at sunset on 17 April 2005, after having run aground a few hours earlier in Botany Bay. On arrival, ownership of the vessel was transferred from the HM Bark Endeavour Foundation to the Australian National Maritime Museum.

In mid-April 2011, Endeavour sailed from Sydney on her first circumnavigation of Australia. The counter-clockwise voyage around the continent ended in May 2012, with fifteen ports visited and 13,300 nautical miles (24,600 km; 15,300 mi) sailed.

In October 2013 Endeavour participated in the International Fleet Review 2013 in Sydney, Australia.

The replica was set to circumnavigate Australia in March 2020 to May 2021, but it was suspended due to the COVID-19 pandemic.
