= The Hall School, Hampstead =

Coordinates: 51.54543°N 0.17088°W

The Hall School

Location
- Crossfield Road; Hampstead, London, NW3 4NU; England

Information
- Type: Independent boys preparatory school
- Motto: Latin: Hinc in Altiora "From here to higher things"
- Religious affiliation: A Christian foundation catering for all denominations
- Established: 1889
- Headmaster: Henry Keighley-Elstub
- Gender: Boys
- Age: 4 to 13
- Colours: Black, Grey and Pink
- Website: www.hallschool.co.uk

The Hall School is an independent boys' preparatory school in Belsize Park, Hampstead, north London, teaching boys aged 4 to 13.

== Description ==
The school, across its three buildings, a new one being built currently, has a roll of over 432 boys, approximately 60 in each year from Years 1–8 and 40 in Reception. Reception to Year 3 (ages 4–7) are based in the Junior School, Years 4 and 5 (ages 8–10) in the Middle School and Years 6 to 8 (ages 11–13) in the Senior School. The school operates a house system of four houses: Blue, Green, Orange and Purple. These are used throughout the school for academic, physical and musical competitions.

The school is known for its pink and grey uniform consisting for many years of a pink school blazer, cap and tie. This would prove somewhat of a target for the other pupils in the area, as Giles Coren, an old boy, recalled in The Times.

== History ==
The school originated as Belsize School, founded in 1889 by Francis John Wrottesley, who with his wife had taken fee-paying pupils at their home in nearby 18 Buckland Crescent since 1881. The Wrottesleys sold their school in 1898 to D. H. Marshall, who took over an adjoining house in 1903, when there were 58 boys, including 10 boarders. In 1905 Marshall bought Rebecca and Sarah Allen Olney's girls' school, which his wife continued at Buckland Crescent.

Marshall moved the boys to Crossfield Road and renamed the school The Hall. The roll was over 100 in 1909, when he sold the school to G. H. Montauban. It prepared boys aged 5 to 13 for public schools and won many scholarships. Montauban bought Woodcote at 69 Belsize Park, at the corner of Buckland Crescent, in 1916 and opened it in 1917 for boys under 8. The school was recognized from 1919, when Montauban sold The Hall to R. T. Gladstone, retaining the junior school until 1923.

In the 1920s the roll increased from 60 to 270. In 1935 ownership passed to a private company. The main building was extended in 1935 and the junior school in 1938. The roll fell to 45 in 1940, but under a new company rose to 170 in 1942. The junior school, evacuated in 1939, reopened in 1942 with 35 boys. The school became a charitable trust in 1952.

In 1951 there were 302 boys aged 5 to 15, including 30 boarders, but boarding ceased between 1967 and 1974, never to return. In 1983 the school prepared up to 320 boys for public schools.

In 2025 there were 380 pupils.

== Notable alumni ==
- List of people educated at The Hall School, Hampstead
