= List of ships named HMS Endeavour =

HMS Endeavour may refer to one of the following ships:

== In the Royal Navy ==
- English ship Endeavour (1652), a 36-gun ship purchased in 1652 and sold in 1656
- HMS Endeavour (1694 bomb vessel), a 4-gun bomb vessel purchased in 1694 and sold in 1696
- HMS Endeavour (1694 fire ship), a fire ship purchased in 1694 and sold in 1696
- HMS Endeavour (1694 hoy), a storeship hoy purchased in 1694 and sold in 1705
- HMS Endeavour Transport (1708), a storeship launched in 1708 and sold in 1713
- HMS Endeavour (1763 cutter), a cutter purchased in 1763 and sold in 1771
- HMS Endeavour (1763 sloop), a 14-gun sloop, purchased in 1763 and foundered in 1780 in a hurricane off Jamaica
- HM Bark Endeavour, originally Earl of Pembroke, a 10-gun bark purchased in 1768; known as Endeavour Bark to distinguish her from her contemporaries listed above; was commanded by Lieutenant James Cook in his first voyage of exploration to the Pacific, 1768–1771; sold in 1775
  - HM Bark Endeavour (replica), a sailing replica of Cook's Endeavour
- HMS Endeavour (1775), a schooner purchased in 1775 and sold in 1782
- HMS Endeavour (1781), another schooner purchased in 1782; there may have been other brigs or schooners obtained in the West Indies during this period, as the name was retained for several replacement vessels
- HMS Endeavour (1912), a survey ship launched in 1912, used as a depot ship from 1940, and sold in 1946

== In the Royal New Zealand Navy ==
- HMNZS Endeavour (1956), which served as the Antarctic support vessel from 1956 to 1962
- USS Namakagon (AOG-53), which served as the Antarctic support vessel HMNZS Endeavour from 1962 to 1971
- HMNZS Endeavour (A11), a fleet tanker commissioned in 1988, and decommissioned in 2017

== See also ==
- Apollo 15 Command Module, the first NASA vessel named in honor of James Cook's HM Bark Endeavour
- Space Shuttle Endeavour, the second NASA vessel named in honor of James Cook's HM Bark Endeavour
- Crew Dragon Endeavour, the third spacecraft named in honor of James Cook's HM Bark Endeavour
- HMNZS Endeavour, several ships of the name
- Four Starfleet vessels were named USS Endeavour in various Star Trek series
- Endeavour (disambiguation)
