= Nicholas Shaw =

English actor

- Born: 1982 (age 43–44)
- Occupation: Actor
- Years active: 2004–present
- Spouse: Michelle Shaw (m. 2013)
- Children: 2

Nicholas Shaw (born 1982) is an English actor known for his work in television, film, and theatre, including roles in Bridgerton, Endeavour, Young Wallander, Munich: The Edge of War, and Ridley Scott's Napoleon, as well as stage work with the Royal Shakespeare Company and at Shakespeare's Globe.

== Personal life ==
Shaw attended McAuley Catholic High School in Doncaster before training at the Drama Centre London, graduating in 2004. He married Michelle Shaw on 25 August 2013. The couple have two children and live in Staffordshire.

== Television and film ==
Shaw first gained attention in the lead role of Doug in The Rotters Club, the TV series based on Jonathan Coe’s novel, broadcast in 2004. He played guest roles in other TV series, Dalziel & Pascoe, Heartbeat and Afterlife, and appeared as the poet, John Keats in The Romantics.

He was Justin, one of the lead roles, in the eight-part TV series, Goldplated, in 2006, and played the lead in the 2007 TV film, All About Me, co-starring with Phoebe Nicholls, Danny Webb and Phil Davis. In 2008, he played Sandoval in an episode of Heroes and Villains about Hernán Cortés. In 2010 played a role in the "shockumentary" The Possession of David O'Reilly. The same year, he played Matthew Leicester in 16 episodes of the BBC soap opera Doctors, and DC Hadley in the ITV series Foyle's War. Between 2010 and 2012, he played John Fisher in the BBC series "Land Girls".

In 2014, he played Matt in the drama film In Transit. In 2017, he appeared in the documentary series Murder Maps as Edward Sorrell. He returned to film in 2020 in Running Naked, credited as Nick Shaw, and that year also appeared as Lord Thompson in the Netflix series Bridgerton.

In 2022, Shaw played Jörgen Moberg in three episodes of the second series of the Netflix crime drama Young Wallander. In 2021, he also played Baz Appleby in an episode of Endeavour, Rory Lycett in Holby City, and Parliamentary Aide James Berwick in the Netflix historical thriller Munich: The Edge of War, directed by Christian Schwochow. In 2023, he appeared in Ridley Scott's historical epic Napoleon, in a supporting role during the Battle of Austerlitz sequence.

== Theatre ==
In 2005, Shaw played Benjamin in the UK tour of Oxford Stage Company’s production of Gregory Moton’s translation of August Strindberg’s Easter, directed by Dominic Dromgoole. The following year, his performance earned him a commendation in the annual Ian Charleson Awards.

In summer 2007, Shaw appeared in two productions at Shakespeare's Globe theatre: The Merchant of Venice, alongside John McEnery and Jack Shepherd’s new play, Holding Fire!, which saw Shaw reunited with Dominic Dromgoole as director. In summer 2008, he played Romeo in Romeo and Juliet and Lysander in A Midsummer Night's Dream, both at the Open Air Theatre, London.

He played the title role in the Northern Broadsides production of Hamlet in 2011, receiving critical acclaim. "Like the production itself, he is daringly theatrical and heartbreakingly human", said The Observer.

In March 2012, Shaw played the central character, Misail Alexandrovich Polznev, in Peter Gill's adaptation of Chekhov's 'A Provincial Life', at the National Theatre Wales, Cardiff. He plays a young man who rejects his inheritance as the son of an architect. He adopts the life of a workman before moving to the country to run a school on the estate of the higher-born, dilettante wife, Marie, who eventually deserts him.

In February 2013 he returned to Northern Broadsides to play John in their acclaimed production of Githa Sowerby's 'Rutherford and Son'. With adaptations by Blake Morrison the production toured across the length and breadth of Britain before finishing at St James Theatre, London in June.

Later in 2013, Shaw joined the Royal Shakespeare Company's production of Wolf Hall and Bring Up the Bodies, adapted by Mike Poulton from Hilary Mantel's novels and directed by Jeremy Herrin, playing Harry Percy and William Brereton. The production, which starred Ben Miles as Thomas Cromwell, opened at the Swan Theatre, Stratford-upon-Avon, before transferring to the Aldwych Theatre in the West End and later to Broadway.

In 2016, Shaw played the poet John Dryden in the West End transfer of Jessica Swale's Nell Gwynn at the Apollo Theatre, starring Gemma Arterton in the title role and directed by Christopher Luscombe. Reviewing the production for The Arts Desk, critic Matt Wolf singled out Shaw's performance among the supporting cast.

In 2018, Shaw played the miner Spud in Beth Steel's Wonderland at Nottingham Playhouse, directed by Adam Penford, in a production that toured to Northern Stage, Newcastle, the following year. British Theatre Guide praised his performance, writing that he "moves from jocular lothario to picket-line scab in the blink of an eye and with intense feeling in both."

In 2022, Shaw appeared in Neil Bartlett's adaptation of Jekyll and Hyde, a co-production between Derby Theatre and Queen's Theatre Hornchurch. In 2023, he worked as assistant director on Claybody Theatre and the New Vic's revival of The Card, based on the novel by Arnold Bennett, directed by Conrad Nelson.

== Political activity ==
Shaw is a member of the Labour Party. He stood as the Labour candidate for the Milford ward in the 2023 Stafford Borough Council election, increasing the Labour vote share in the ward from 22.7% in 2019 to 37.6%, though he was not elected, with the seat retained by the Conservative incumbent. Since 2024, he has served as Head of Office for Leigh Ingham, the Member of Parliament for Stafford.

== Filmography ==
=== Film ===
Year	Title	Role
2010	The Possession of David O'Reilly	Alex
2014	In Transit	Matt
2020	Running Naked	Allen
2021	Munich: The Edge of War	Parliamentary Aide James Berwick
2023	Napoleon	French Signal Man

=== Television ===
Year	Title	Role
2004	The Rotters' Club	Doug (lead role)
2004	Dalziel and Pascoe	Guest role
2004	Heartbeat	Guest role
2004	Afterlife	Guest role
2004	The Romantics	John Keats
2006	Goldplated	Justin (lead role, 8 episodes)
2007	All About Me	Lead role
2008	Heroes and Villains	Sandoval (episode on Hernán Cortés)
2010	Doctors	Matthew Leicester (16 episodes)
2010	Foyle's War	DC Hadley
2010–2012	Land Girls	John Fisher (recurring, series 1–3)
2017	Murder Maps	Edward Sorrell
2020	Bridgerton	Lord Thompson (2 episodes)
2021	Endeavour	Baz Appleby (1 episode)
2021	Holby City	Rory Lycett (1 episode)
2022	Young Wallander	Jörgen Moberg (3 episodes)

=== Theatre ===
Year	Production	Role	Venue/Company
2005	Easter	Benjamin	Oxford Stage Company (UK tour)
2007	The Merchant of Venice	Lorenzo	Shakespeare's Globe
2007	Holding Fire!	Friedrich Engels	Shakespeare's Globe
2008	Romeo and Juliet	Romeo	Open Air Theatre, Regent's Park
2008	A Midsummer Night's Dream	Lysander	Open Air Theatre, Regent's Park
2010	'Tis Pity She's a Whore	Soranzo	Liverpool Everyman
2010	Anthology	Charlie O'Neill	Slung Low / Liverpool Everyman
2011	Hamlet	Hamlet	Northern Broadsides / New Vic Theatre
2012	A Provincial Life	Misail Alexandrovich Polznev	National Theatre Wales
2012	They Only Come at Night	Chester Rickwood	Slung Low at Singapore Arts Festival
2013	Rutherford and Son	John	Northern Broadsides / New Vic Theatre
2013–2015	Wolf Hall and Bring Up the Bodies	Harry Percy / William Brereton	Royal Shakespeare Company; West End; Broadway
2016	Nell Gwynn	John Dryden	Apollo Theatre, West End
2019	Wonderland	Spud	Nottingham Playhouse; Northern Stage
2019	Brassed Off	Andy	New Vic Theatre
2022	Jekyll and Hyde	Jekyll / Hyde	Derby Theatre; Queen's Theatre Hornchurch
2023	The Card	Assistant director (non-acting role)	New Vic Theatre
2023	Cinderella	Joseph / Matthew	Derby Theatre
