= Endeavour =

Endeavour or endeavor may refer to:

== People ==
=== Fictional characters ===
- Endeavour Morse, central character of the Inspector Morse novels by Colin Dexter
- Endeavor, the hero name for the character Enji Todoroki from the anime series My Hero Academia

== Places ==
Endeavor

- Endeavor, Pennsylvania, US
- Endeavor, Wisconsin, a city in the US

Endeavour

- Endeavour (crater), on Mars
- Endeavour, Saskatchewan, a village in Saskatchewan, Canada
- Endeavour, Trinidad and Tobago, a district of the Borough of Chaguanas
- Endeavour Bank, a submarine mountain in the North Atlantic
- Endeavour Hydrothermal Vents, a group of hydrothermal vents in the northeastern Pacific Ocean
- Endeavour Massif, a massif in Victoria Land, Antarctica
- Endeavour Piedmont Glacier, a glacier on Ross Island near Antarctica
- Endeavour Reef, north of Cape Tribulation, Queensland
- Endeavour River, in Far North Queensland, Australia
- Endeavour Strait, running between the Australian mainland and Prince of Wales Island

== Awards ==
- Endeavour Award, a science fiction literary award
- Endeavour Awards, a scholarship program by the Australian Government

== Computing and technology ==
- Endeavour (supercomputer), a shared memory supercomputer at the NASA Ames Research Center
- Endeavour Software Project Management, a server-based solution for corporate level project management
- EndeavourOS, an Arch Linux based Linux distribution
- Telstra Endeavour, a submarine cable between Sydney and Hawaii

== Education ==
- Endeavor Charter School, in Raleigh, North Carolina, United States
- Endeavour College, a Lutheran high school in Mawson Lakes, South Australia
- Endeavour Learning and Skills Centre, an adult and further education college in Kingston upon Hull, England

== Buildings ==
- Endeavour (building), a residential tower in Greater Houston, Texas
- Endeavour House, Suffolk County Council headquarters located in Ipswich, Suffolk, England

== Media ==
- Endeavour (journal), a scholarly journal of the history of science, technology, and medicine
- Endeavour Radio, a community radio station for Boston, Lincolnshire
- Endeavour (TV series), a prequel series to Inspector Morse

== Music ==
- Monstercat 019 - Endeavour, the 19th compilation album released by the Monstercat record label

== Organizations ==
Endeavor

- Christian Endeavor International, a nondenominational evangelical society
- Endeavor (non-profit), an American non-profit organization that promotes entrepreneurship
- Endeavor Air, an American regional airline, a subsidiary of Delta Air Lines
- Endeavor Talent Agency, in Beverly Hills, California
- Endeavor (company), successor to Endeavor Talent Agency

Endeavour

- Endeavour Energy, a state owned electricity infrastructure company in Australia
- Endeavour Foundation, a non-profit organisation in Queensland, Australia
- Endeavour Group, Australian drinks retailer
- Endeavour Entertainment, a home media company responsible for releasing Thomas & Friends videos in New Zealand
- Endeavour Yacht Corporation, an American sailboat manufacturer

== Transport ==
=== Ships ===
- Endeavour (yacht), a 1934 J-class yacht
- Endeavour II (barque), wrecked in New Zealand in 1971
- HMS Endeavour, a bark in the Royal Navy 1768–1775, commanded by James Cook
- HMS Endeavour replica, a modern replica of the former
- The schooner Endeavour, which unsuccessfully attempted to salvage L'Enterprise in 1803.
- HMNZS Endeavour, any of three ships of the Royal New Zealand Navy
- STS Young Endeavour, a 1987 sail training ship operated by the Australian Navy
- National Geographic Endeavour, exploration ship of the U.S. National Geographic Society
- RV Endeavor, an Alaskan research vessel of the U.S. National Science Foundation

=== Space vehicles ===
- Endeavour, the Apollo 15 command and service module
- Space Shuttle Endeavour, one of the retired orbiters of the NASA Space Shuttle program
- Crew Dragon Endeavour, the first SpaceX Crew Dragon capsule to take astronauts to space, on mission Crew Dragon Demo-2

=== Trains ===
- Endeavour (train), a former passenger train service in New Zealand
- New South Wales Endeavour railcar, a diesel railcar of the NSW TrainLink network in New South Wales, Australia

=== Road vehicles ===
- Endeavour, World Solar Challenge 2009 and 2011 vehicle by Cambridge University Eco Racing
- Ford Everest, a midsize SUV also known as the Ford Endeavour in India
- Mitsubishi Endeavor, a mid-size SUV

=== Fictional vehicles ===
- Endeavour, a spacecraft from Rendezvous with Rama by Arthur C. Clarke
- Endeavour, an Alliance Strike carrier from Starlancer
- H.M.S. Endeavour, a starfaring ship from the Micronauts (comics)
- HMS Endeavour, the flagship of the East India Trading Company from Pirates of the Caribbean

== Other uses ==
- Callistemon 'Splendens', a plant cultivar also known as "Endeavour"
- Endeavour, a brand of drug-eluting stent
- Endeavor, a strategy game from Z-Man Games
- Endeavor: Deep Sea, a board game
