= Goldplated =

2006 British television drama series

- Genre: Drama
- Created by: Jimmy Gardner
- Starring: David Schofield; Barbara Marten; Nicholas Shaw; Jaime Winstone; Poppy Miller; Darren Tighe; Kelly Harrison; Kenny Doughty
- Country of origin: United Kingdom
- Original language: English
- No. of series: 1
- No. of episodes: 8

Production
- Executive producer: Simon Heath
- Producer: John Chapman
- Cinematography: Tony Slater Ling
- Production company: World Productions

Original release
- Network: Channel 4
- Release: 18 October – 29 November 2006

Goldplated is an eight-part drama series from World Productions which made its debut on Channel 4 on Wednesday 18 October 2006 at 10.00pm. It was created by Jimmy Gardner. It follows self-made businessman John White (played by David Schofield), as he struggles to complete a business deal that could be compromised by past indiscretions.

== Plot ==
Similarly to The Sopranos (which the show has been compared to), John White's personal life is intertwined with his business life. He lives in Northern England with his partner Cassidy, who is half his age, and their son, while in the process of divorcing his wife Beth. His oldest son Darren is his business partner, while his other two children with Beth also feature.

== Characters ==
- John White, played by David Schofield
- Beth White, played by Barbara Marten
- Justin White, played by Nicholas Shaw
- Lauren White, played by Jaime Winstone
- Terese White, Played by Poppy Miller
- Darren White, played by Darren Tighe
- Cassidy, played by Kelly Harrison
- Coll, played by Kenny Doughty

== Filming locations ==
- Over 50 per cent of the filming takes place in the Borough of Macclesfield in Cheshire on the edge of the Pennines, in Northern England.
- Alderley Edge, Cheshire as Alderley Edge
- Brasingamens Pub, Alderley Edge, Cheshire as the Nightclub
- Over Alderley National Trust, Cheshire as various
- Knutsford The house location, Cheshire
- De Vere Mottram Hall, Mottram, Macclesfield, Cheshire
- Mere Country Golf Club, Knutsford, Cheshire
- Hale Barns, Greater Manchester

== Episode list ==
| No. | Title | Directed by | Written by | Original release date | UK viewers (millions) |
|---|---|---|---|---|---|
| 1 | "The Christening" | Julie Anne Robinson | Jimmy Gardner | 18 October 2006 | 1.4 |
| 2 | "The Funeral" | Julie Anne Robinson | Jimmy Gardner | 25 October 2006 | N/A |
| 3 | "Lauren's Affair" | Julie Anne Robinson | Kate O'Riordan | 1 November 2006 | N/A |
| 4 | "Darren in Love" | Robert Delamere | Jimmy Gardner | 8 November 2006 | N/A |
| 5 | "The Charity Dinner" | Robert Delamere | Jimmy Gardner | 15 November 2006 | N/A |
| 6 | "Cassidy's Mother" | Robert Delamere | Nicholas Blincoe | 22 November 2006 | N/A |
| 7 | "Naomi Moves into Whiteoaks" | Susan Tully | Sarah Phelps | 29 November 2006 | N/A |
| 8 | "Retribution" | Susan Tully | Jimmy Gardner | 29 November 2006 | N/A |

== Reception ==
Despite a promotional effort that included a nationwide poster campaign featuring giant gold credit cards across Great Britain, the drama fared poorly in the ratings, drawing only 1.4 million viewers for its opening episode. Reviews were not much better: Daily Express critic Matt Baylis described it as "a string of cliches long ago exhausted by older and better shows"; Ian Johns of The Times was confused about the tone, but praised the team behind the series.
