= HMNZS Endeavour =

HMNZS Endeavour may refer to one of the following ships of the Royal New Zealand Navy named in honour of Captain Cook's Bark Endeavour.

- HMNZS Endeavour (1956), served as the Antarctic support vessel from 1956 to 1962
- HMNZS Endeavour (A184), served as the Antarctic support vessel from 1962 to 1971
- HMNZS Endeavour (A11), the fleet tanker from 1988 to 2017

== See also ==
- Endeavour (disambiguation)
