= Endeavour (building) =

Coordinates: 29.5652°N 95.0624°W

Endeavour is a 30-story high-rise condominium building in Pasadena, Texas, in southeastern Greater Houston.

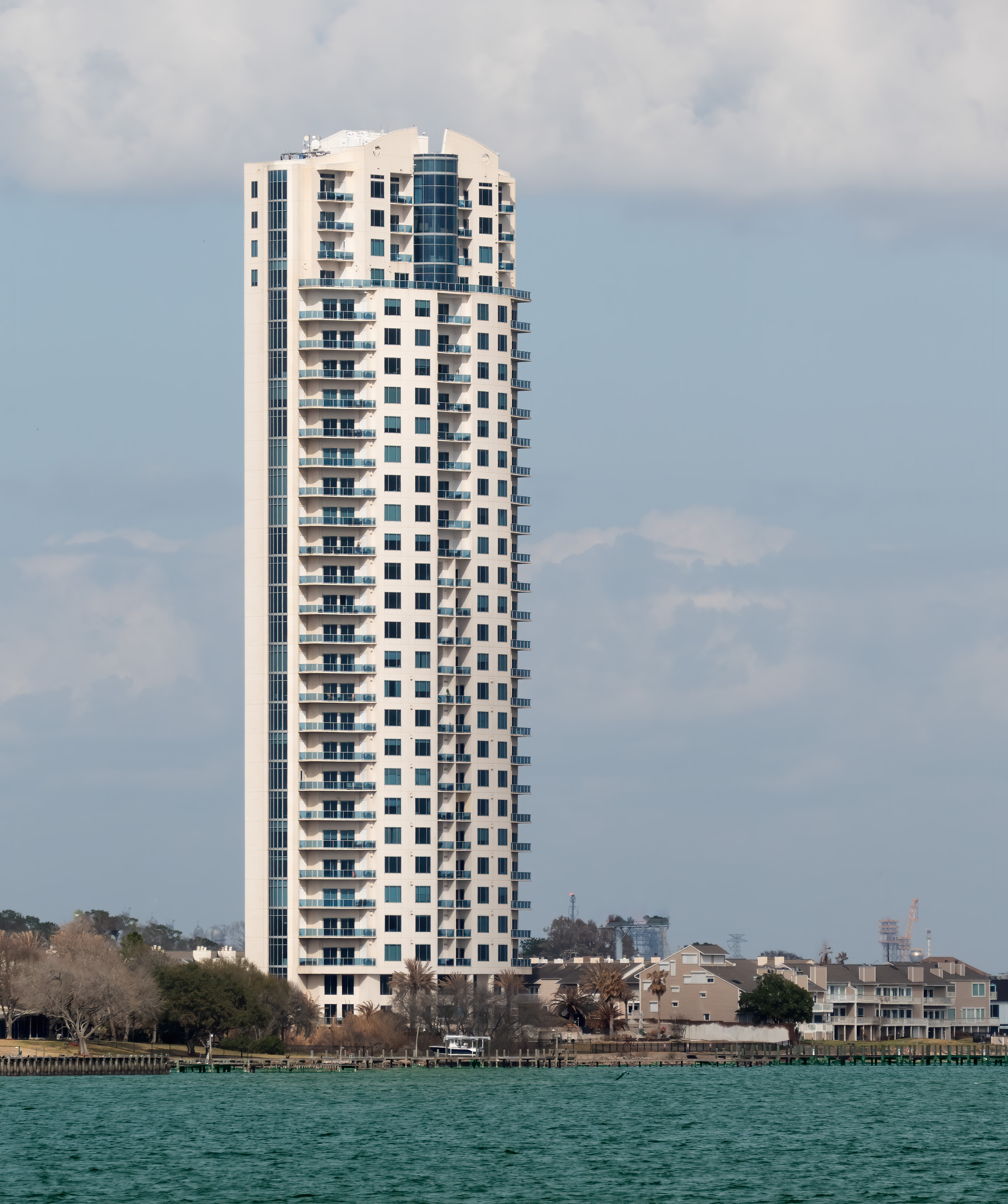
Endeavour Condominiums -- Houston Clear Lake

The building was built in 2008 on the shore of Clear Lake, originally envisioned to be the first of a number of high-rise residential buildings that would be built on the waterfront of the generally low-rise suburban area near the Johnson Space Center. However, damage from Hurricane Ike in late 2008, combined with the property-market downturn of the 2008 financial crisis, led to the developer filing for bankruptcy in May 2009, having sold only 36 of the 80 units. The remaining 44 units were purchased in bankruptcy court in December 2009 by an investment partnership, for $9.5 million plus past-due taxes. The new owners repaired and renovated the building at a cost of $2 million, and relaunched condominium sales in 2010.
