= HMS Endeavour (1694 bomb vessel) =

Seventeenth century Royal Navy vessel

History

England
- Name: HMS Endeavour
- Ordered: 2 March 1694
- Acquired: 17 March 1694 for £444
- Commissioned: 1694
- Decommissioned: 1695
- In service: 1694–1695
- Fate: Sold out of service

General characteristics
- Class & type: 4-gun bomb vessel
- Tons burthen: 5910/94 (bm)
- Length: 40 ft 0 in (12.2 m) (keel)
- Beam: 16 ft 8 in (5.1 m)
- Depth of hold: 9 ft 3 in (2.8 m)
- Propulsion: Sail
- Sail plan: Ketch-rigged
- Complement: 18
- Armament: 4 × 5-pdr minions, 1 × 13-inch mortar

HMS Endeavour was a 4-gun bomb vessel of the Royal Navy, purchased in 1694 but sold out of service the following year.

== Construction and purchase ==
In early 1694, ministers in the government of William III resolved to augment the Royal Navy's offensive capacity through provision of bomb vessels to attack French ports. In addition to the Navy's four existing Serpent-class bomb vessels, Admiralty requested that the Board of Ordnance purchase twelve private merchant ships for refitting as bombs. However, by April 1694 only eight such vessels were available, to which Admiralty then added the sixth rate sloop Julian Prize to form the expanded bomb group.

Endeavour was the smallest of the new vessels, with a 40 ft 0 in (12.2 m) keel, a beam of 16 ft 8 in (5.1 m) and measuring 5910/94 tons burthen. She was ketch-rigged, with a deep hold measuring 9 ft 3 in (2.8 m) and capacity to provide mountings for a single 13-inch mortar. Her purchase price was £444, paid to London merchant Richard Beach. A further £473 was spent by Admiralty on Endeavour's conversion to bomb vessel status, and £200 for fittings. The ship was initially armed with four five-pounder minion cannons, with a crew of 18 supported by Royal Artillery gunners.

== Naval service ==
Endeavour was commissioned in 1694 under Commander Jacob Wright, for immediate service in war against France. In company with other purchased and converted bomb vessels, she was attached to Admiral John Berkeley's squadron for action against both merchant shipping and the fleets of privateers that were operating from French ports. Wright was superseded as commander when Endeavour reached her station in Berkeley's force, replaced by Captain (and later vice admiral) James Mighells.

The ship engaged in three port bombardments over the next twelve months; Dieppe and Le Havre in August 1694 and Saint-Malo in the following year. The assault on Dieppe resulted in widespread destruction of civilian property but did no damage to shipping or port facilities. Subsequent raids were even less effective, particularly off Saint-Malo where strong winds and tides meant Endeavour was unable to keep its mortar pointed towards the target. Having failed to affect French ports or privateers, Endeavour and her fellow bomb vessels were returned to England after the Saint-Malo raid.

Naval historians have subsequently described Endeavour and her sister ships' contribution to Berkeley's squadron as a "great disappointment" to the British, with their port bombardments representing little more than "nuisance raids" due to the inaccuracy of their fire. In recognition of her failings Endeavour was sold out of naval service late in 1695, less than two years after her initial purchase.

== Bibliography ==
- Jones, J.R. (1988). "Limitations of British sea power in the French Wars, 1689–1815". In Black, Jeremy; Woodfine, Philip (eds.). The British Navy and the Use of Naval Power in the Eighteenth Century. Leicester University Press. ISBN 0718513088.
- McLaughlan, Ian (2014). The Sloop of War, 1650–1763. Seaforth Publishing. ISBN 9781848321878.
- Winfield, Rif (2009). British Warships of the Age of Sail 1603–1714: Design, Construction, Careers and Fates. Seaforth. ISBN 9781848320406.
