= HMS Endeavour =

18th-century Royal Navy research vessel

Coordinates: 41°36′N 71°21′W

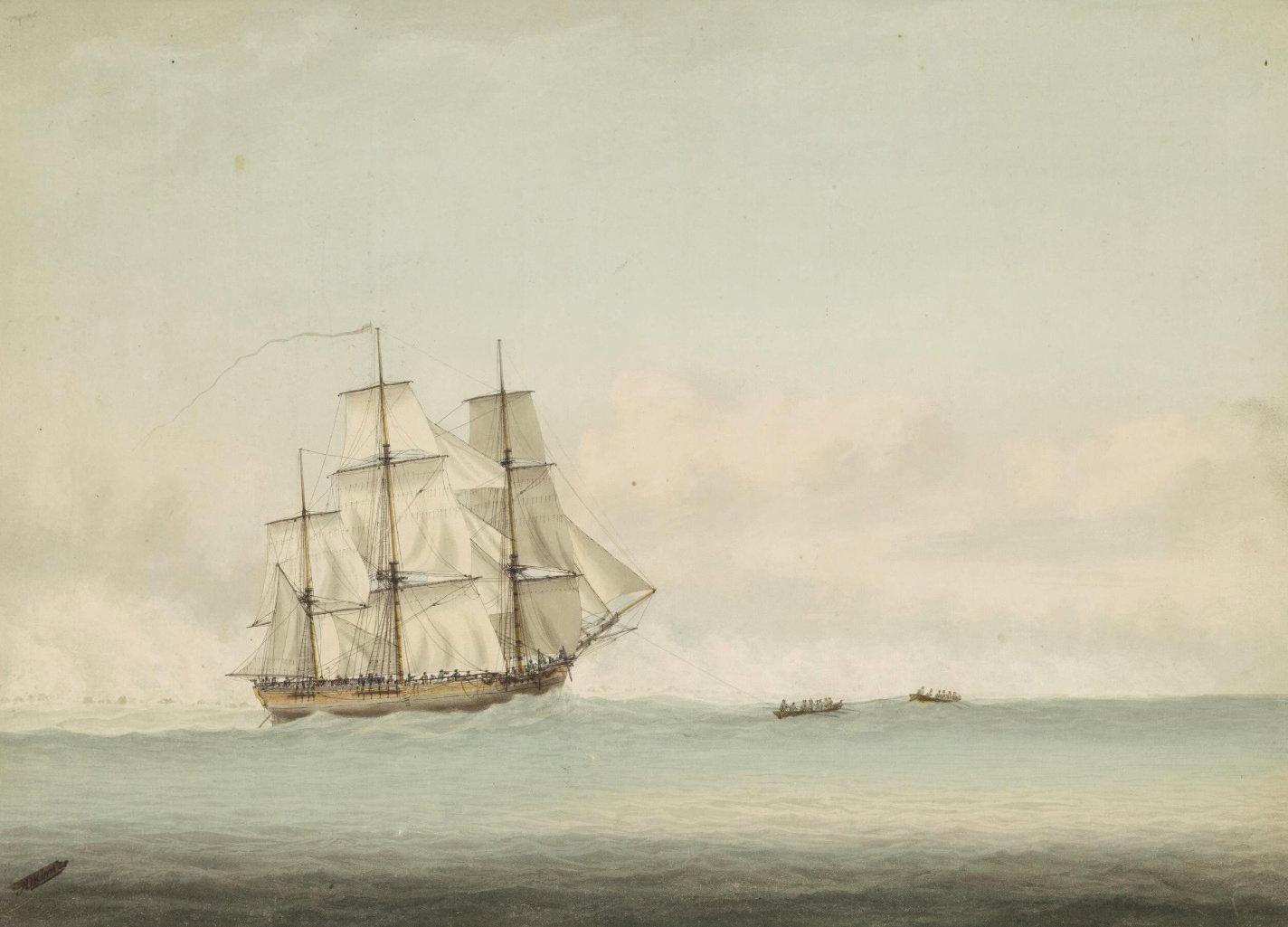
- HMS Endeavour off the coast of New Holland by Samuel Atkins

History

Great Britain
- Name: Endeavour
- Operator: Thomas Millner, Royal Navy, J. Mather
- Builder: Thomas Fishburn, Whitby
- Launched: June 1764
- Acquired: 28 March 1768 as Earl of Pembroke
- Commissioned: 26 May 1768
- Decommissioned: September 1774
- Out of service: March 1775, sold
- Renamed: Lord Sandwich, February 1776
- Home port: Plymouth, United Kingdom
- Fate: Scuttled, Newport, Rhode Island, 1778

General characteristics
- Class & type: Bark
- Tons burthen: 366 49/94 (bm)
- Length: 97 ft 8 in (29.77 m) (Note: Other sources give Endeavour's length overall as 106 ft (32 m).)
- Beam: 29 ft 2 in (8.89 m)
- Depth of hold: 11 ft 4 in (3.45 m)
- Sail plan: Full-rigged ship; 3,321 square yards (2,777 m^{2}) of sail
- Speed: 7 to 8 knots (13 to 15 km/h) maximum
- Boats & landing craft carried: yawl, pinnace, longboat, two skiffs
- Complement: 94, comprising: 71 ship's company; 12 marines; 11 civilians
- Armament: 10 4-pdrs, 12 swivel guns

HMS Endeavour (Note: The abbreviation "HMS" was not in use at the time, but "His/Her Majesty's Ship" was, and this is a valid if less precise way to refer to the Endeavour. "HMS" is commonly used retroactively in modern sources. James Cook in his own documentation of the voyage referred to it as "His Britannick Majesty's Bark" but occasionally as "His Britannick Majesty's Ship".) was a Royal Navy research vessel that Lieutenant James Cook commanded to Tahiti, New Zealand and Australia on his first voyage of discovery from 1768 to 1771.

She was launched in 1764 as the collier Earl of Pembroke, with the Navy purchasing her in 1768 for a scientific mission to the Pacific Ocean and to explore the seas for the surmised Terra Australis Incognita or "unknown southern land". Commissioned as His Majesty's Bark Endeavour, she departed Plymouth in August 1768, rounded Cape Horn and reached Tahiti in time to observe the 1769 transit of Venus across the Sun. She then set sail into the largely uncharted ocean to the south, stopping at the islands of Huahine, Bora Bora, and Raiatea west of Tahiti to allow Cook to claim them for Great Britain. In September 1769, she anchored off New Zealand, becoming the first European vessel to reach the islands since Abel Tasman's Heemskerck 127 years earlier.

In April 1770, Endeavour became the first European ship to reach the east coast of Australia, with Cook going ashore at what is now known as Botany Bay. Endeavour then sailed north along the Australian coast. She narrowly avoided disaster after running aground on the Great Barrier Reef, and Cook had to throw her guns overboard to lighten her. Endeavour was beached on the Australian mainland for seven weeks to permit repairs to her hull. Resuming her voyage, she limped into port in Batavia in October 1770, her crew sworn to secrecy about the lands that they had visited. From Batavia Endeavour continued westward, rounded the Cape of Good Hope on 13 March 1771 and reached the English port of Dover on 12 July, having been at sea for nearly three years.

The ship was largely forgotten after her Pacific voyage, spending the next three years hauling troops and cargo to and from the Falkland Islands. She was renamed in 1775 after being sold into private hands, and used to transport timber from the Baltic. Rehired as a British troop transport during the American War of Independence, she was finally scuttled in a blockade of Narragansett Bay, Rhode Island, in 1778. Historical evidence indicates the ship was sunk just north of Goat Island in Newport Harbor, along with four other British transports.

Relics from Endeavour are displayed at maritime museums worldwide, including an anchor and six of her cannon. A replica of Endeavour was launched in 1994 and is berthed alongside the Australian National Maritime Museum in Sydney. Multiple geographic features are named after the ship, including the Endeavour River and Endeavour Reef, as were three spacecraft. The ship is depicted on the New Zealand fifty-cent coin.

== Construction ==
Endeavour was originally the merchant collier Earl of Pembroke, built by Thomas Fishburn for Thomas Millner, launched in June 1764 from the coal and whaling Port of Whitby in the North Riding of Yorkshire. She was a type known locally as the "Whitby Cat". She was ship-rigged and sturdily built with a broad, flat bow, a square stern and a long, box-like body with a deep hold.

A flat-bottomed design made her well-suited to sailing in shallow waters and allowed her to be beached for loading and unloading of cargo and for basic repairs without requiring a dry dock. Her hull, internal floors, and futtocks were built from traditional white oak, her keel and stern post from elm, and her masts from pine and fir. Plans of the ship also show a double keelson to lock the keel, floors and frames in place.

There is uncertainty about the height of her standing masts, as surviving diagrams of Endeavour depict the body of the vessel only, and not the mast plan. While her main and foremast standing spars were standard for her shipyard and era, an annotation on one surviving ship plan in the National Maritime Museum in Greenwich has the mizzen as "16 yards 29 inches" (15.4 m). If correct, this would produce an oddly truncated mast a full 9 feet (2.7 m) shorter than the naval standards of the day. Late twentieth-century research suggests the annotation may be a transcription error with "19 yards 29 inches" (18.1 m) being the true reading. If so, this would more closely conform with both naval standards and the lengths of the other masts.

== Purchase and refit by the Admiralty ==
On 16 February 1768, the Royal Society petitioned King George III to finance a scientific expedition to the Pacific to study and observe the 1769 transit of Venus across the sun. Royal approval was granted for the expedition, and the Admiralty elected to combine the scientific voyage with a confidential mission to search the south Pacific for signs of the postulated continent Terra Australis Incognita (or "unknown southern land").

The Royal Society suggested command be given to Scottish geographer Alexander Dalrymple, whose acceptance was conditional on a brevet commission as a captain in the Royal Navy. First Lord of the Admiralty Edward Hawke refused, going so far as to say he would rather cut off his right hand than give command of a navy vessel to someone not educated as a seaman. In refusing Dalrymple's command, Hawke was influenced by previous insubordination aboard the sloop HMS Paramour in 1698, when naval officers had refused to take orders from civilian commander Edmond Halley. The impasse was broken when the Admiralty proposed James Cook, a naval officer with a background in mathematics and cartography. Acceptable to both parties, Cook was promoted to lieutenant and named as commander of the expedition.

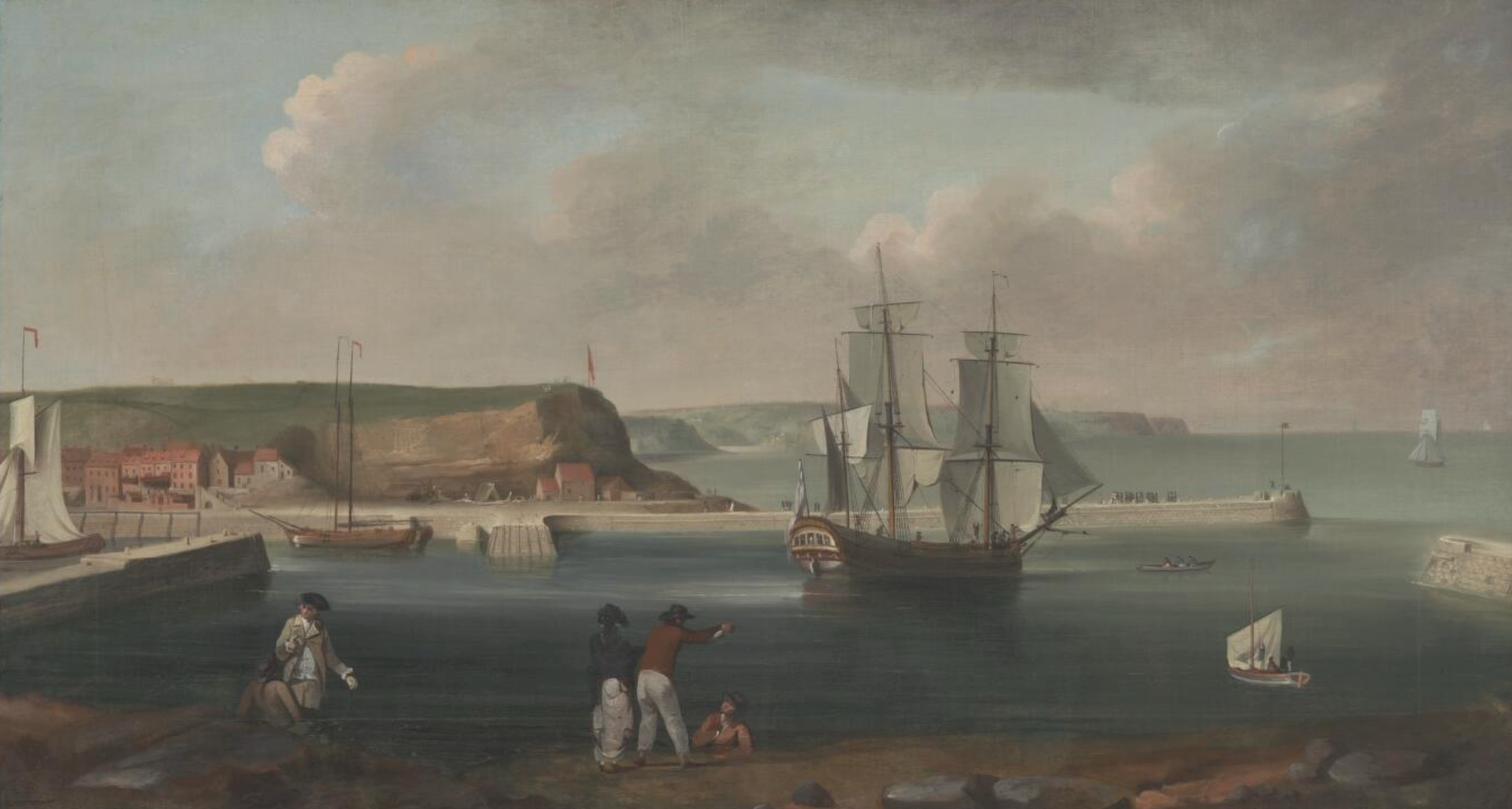
Earl of Pembroke, later HMS Endeavour, leaving Whitby Harbour in 1768. By Thomas Luny, dated 1790.

On 27 May 1768, Cook took command of Earl of Pembroke, valued in March at £2,307. 5s. 6d. but ultimately purchased for £2,840. 10s. 11d. and assigned for use in the Society's expedition. She was refitted at Deptford by the dock's master shipwright Adam Hayes on the River Thames for the sum of £2,294, almost the price of the ship herself. The hull was recaulked and copper sheathed to protect against shipworm, and a third internal deck installed to provide cabins, a powder magazine and storerooms. The new cabins provided around 2 square metres (22 sq ft) of floorspace apiece being allocated to Cook and the Royal Society representatives: naturalist Joseph Banks, Banks' assistants Daniel Solander and Herman Spöring, astronomer Charles Green, and artists Sydney Parkinson and Alexander Buchan. These cabins encircled the officers' mess. The great cabin at the rear of the deck was designed as a workroom for Cook and the Royal Society. On the rear lower deck, cabins facing on to the mates' mess were assigned to lieutenants Zachary Hickes and John Gore, ship's surgeon William Monkhouse, the gunner Stephen Forwood, ship's master Robert Molyneux, and the captain's clerk Richard Orton. The adjoining open mess deck provided sleeping and living quarters for the marines and crew, and additional storage space.

A longboat, pinnace and yawl were provided as ship's boats, though the longboat was rotten, having to be rebuilt and painted with white lead before it could be brought aboard. These were accompanied by two privately owned skiffs, one belonging to the boatswain John Gathrey, and the other to Banks. The ship was also equipped with a set of 28 ft (8.5 m) sweeps to allow her to be rowed forward if becalmed or demasted. The refitted vessel was commissioned as His Majesty's Bark the Endeavour, to distinguish her from the four-gun cutter HMS Endeavour.

On 21 July 1768, Endeavour sailed to Gallions Reach on the Thames to take on armaments to protect her against potentially hostile Pacific island natives. Ten 4-pounder cannon were brought aboard, six of which were mounted on the upper deck with the remainder stowed in the hold. Twelve swivel guns were also supplied, and fixed to posts along the quarterdeck, sides and bow. The ship departed for Plymouth on 30 July, for provisioning and crew boarding of 85, including 12 Royal Marines. Cook also ordered that twelve tons of pig iron be brought on board as sailing ballast.

== Service history ==
=== Voyage of discovery ===
==== Outward voyage ====
Endeavour departed Plymouth on 26 August 1768, carrying 18 months of provisions for 94 people. (Note: Provisions loaded at the outset of the voyage included 6,000 pieces of pork and 4,000 of beef, nine tons of bread, five tons of flour, three tons of sauerkraut, one ton of raisins and sundry quantities of cheese, salt, peas, oil, sugar and oatmeal. Alcohol supplies consisted of 250 barrels of beer, 44 barrels of brandy and 17 barrels of rum.) Livestock on board included pigs, poultry, two greyhounds and a milking goat.

The first port of call was Funchal in the Madeira Islands, which Endeavour reached on 12 September. The ship was recaulked and painted, and fresh vegetables, beef and water were brought aboard for the next leg of the voyage. While in port, an accident cost the life of master's mate Robert Weir, who became entangled in the anchor cable and was dragged overboard when the anchor was released. To replace him, Cook pressed a sailor from an American sloop anchored nearby. (Note: The pressed man was John Thurman, born in New York but a British subject and therefore eligible for involuntary impressment aboard a Royal Navy vessel. Thurman journeyed with Endeavour to Tahiti where he was promoted to the position of sailmaker's assistant, and then to New Zealand and Australia. He died of disease on 3 February 1771, during the voyage between Batavia and Cape Town.)

Endeavour then continued south along the coast of Africa and across the Atlantic to South America, arriving in Rio de Janeiro on 13 November 1768. Fresh food and water were brought aboard and the ship departed for Cape Horn, which she reached during stormy weather on 13 January 1769. Attempts to round the Cape over the next two days were unsuccessful, and Endeavour was repeatedly driven back by wind, rain and contrary tides. Cook noted that the seas off the Cape were large enough to regularly submerge the bow of the ship as she rode down from the crests of waves. At last, on 16 January the wind eased and the ship was able to pass the Cape and anchor in the Bay of Good Success on the Pacific coast. The crew were sent to collect wood and water, while Banks and his team gathered hundreds of plant specimens from along the icy shore. On 17 January two of Banks' servants died from cold while attempting to return to the ship during a heavy snowstorm.

Endeavour resumed her voyage on 21 January 1769, heading west-northwest into warmer weather. She reached Tahiti on 10 April, where she remained for the next three months. The transit of Venus across the Sun occurred on 3 June, and was observed from three separate observatories set up on the shore (there had been concerns that cloud might obscure the event, so additional positions were established to reduce this risk). The main observatory at Fort Venus (now called Point Venus) was equipped with three telescopes and manned by astronomer Charles Green, Cook, and Robert Molyneux, the master of the Endeavour.

==== Pacific exploration ====
The transit observed, Endeavour departed Tahiti on 13 July and headed northwest to allow Cook to survey and name the Society Islands. Landfall was made at Huahine, Raiatea and Borabora, providing opportunities for Cook to claim each of them as British territories. An attempt to land the pinnace on the Austral Island of Rurutu was thwarted by rough surf and the rocky shoreline. On 15 August, Endeavour finally turned south to explore the open ocean for Terra Australis Incognita.

In October 1769, Endeavour reached the coastline of New Zealand, becoming the first European vessel to do so since Abel Tasman's Heemskerck in 1642. Unfamiliar with such ships, the Māori people at Cook's first landing point in Poverty Bay thought the ship was a floating island, or a gigantic bird from their mythical homeland of Hawaiki. Endeavour spent the next six months sailing close to shore, while Cook mapped the coastline and concluded that New Zealand comprised two large islands and was not the hoped-for Terra Australis. In March 1770, the longboat from Endeavour carried Cook ashore to allow him to formally proclaim British sovereignty over New Zealand. On his return, Endeavour resumed her voyage westward, her crew sighting the east coast of Australia on 19 April. On 29 April, she became the first European vessel to make landfall on the east coast of Australia, when Cook landed one of the ship's boats on the southern shore of what is now known as Botany Bay, New South Wales.

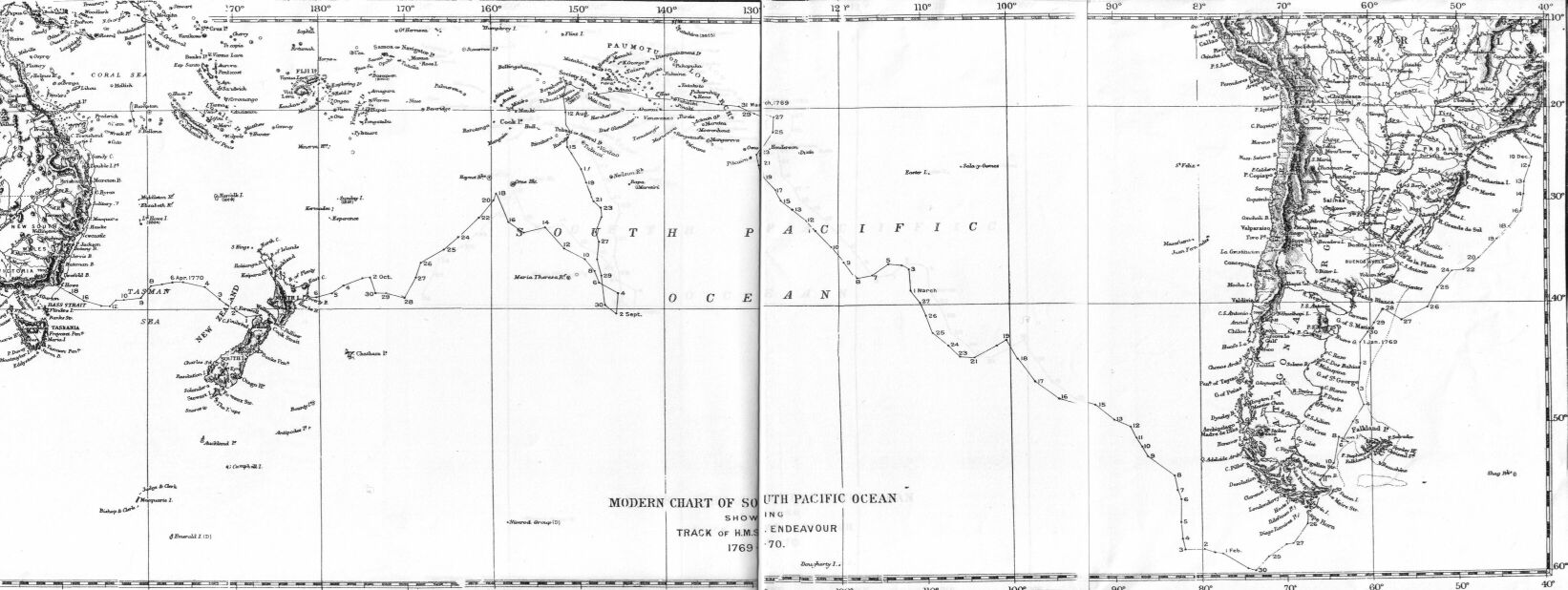
An 1893 chart showing Endeavour's track

==== Shipwreck ====
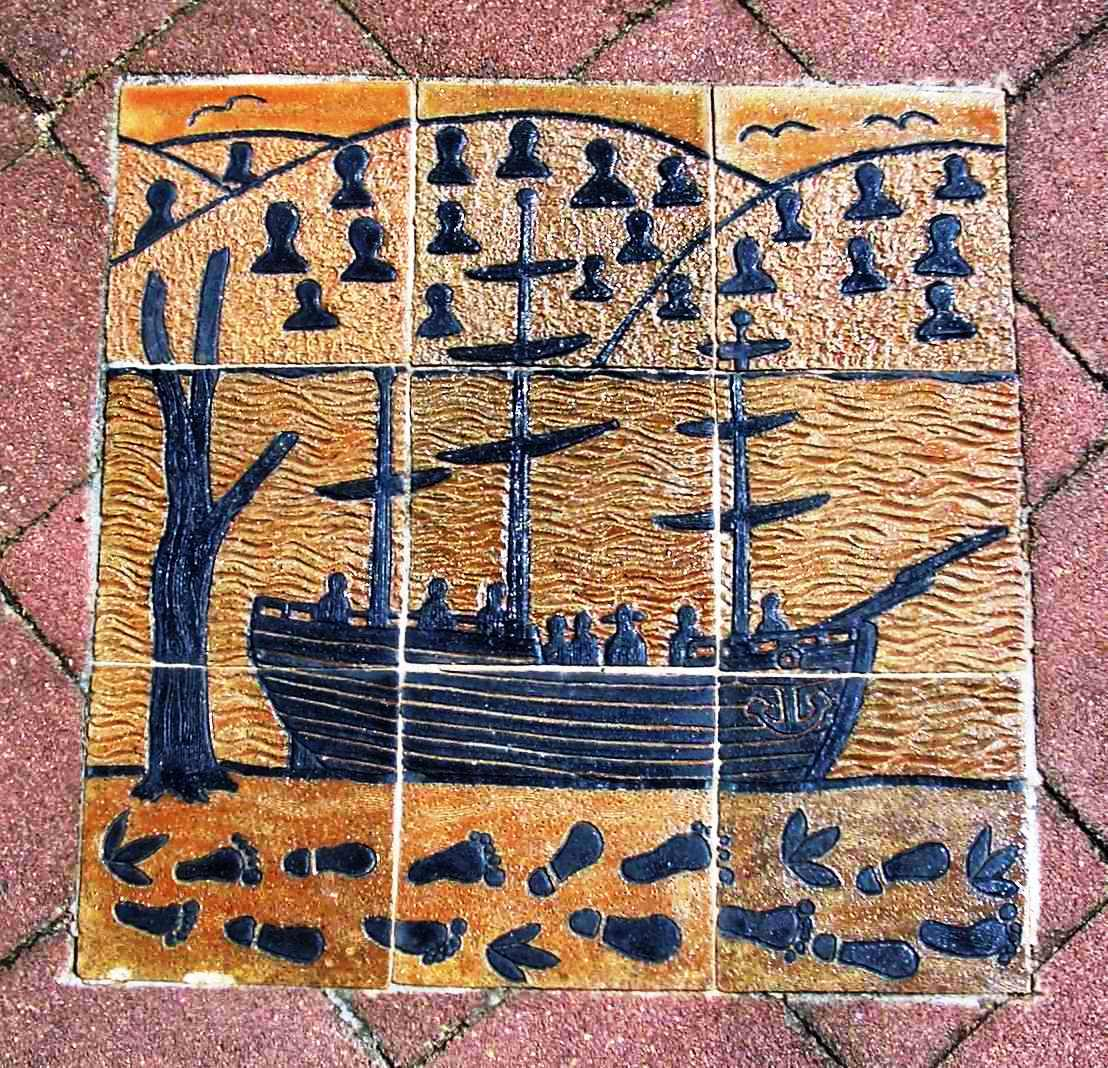
Tile on street depicting HMS Endeavour. Cooktown. 2005

For the next four months, Cook charted the coast of Australia, heading generally northward. Just before 11:00 pm on 11 June 1770, the ship struck a reef, today called Endeavour Reef, within the Great Barrier Reef system. The sails were immediately taken down, a kedging anchor set and an unsuccessful attempt was made to drag the ship back to open water. The reef Endeavour had struck rose so steeply from the seabed that although the ship was hard aground, Cook measured depths up to 70 feet (21 m) less than one ship's length away.

Cook then ordered that the ship be lightened to help her float off the reef. Iron and stone ballast, spoiled stores and all but four of the ship's guns were thrown overboard, and the ship's drinking water pumped out. The crew attached buoys to the discarded guns with the intention of retrieving them later, but this proved impractical. Every man on board took turns on the pumps, including Cook and Banks.

When, by Cook's reckoning, about 40 to 50 long tons (41 to 51 t) of equipment had been thrown overboard, on the next high tide a second unsuccessful attempt was made to pull the ship free. In the afternoon of 12 June, the longboat carried out two large bower anchors, and block and tackle were rigged to the anchor cables to allow another attempt on the evening high tide. The ship had started to take on water through a hole in her hull. Although the leak would certainly increase once off the reef, Cook decided to risk the attempt and at 10:20 pm the ship was floated on the tide and successfully drawn off. The anchors were retrieved, except for one which could not be freed from the seabed and had to be abandoned.

As expected the leak increased once the ship was off the reef, and all three working pumps had to be continually manned. A mistake occurred in sounding the depth of water in the hold, when a new man measured the length of a sounding line from the outside plank of the hull where his predecessor had used the top of the cross-beams. The mistake suggested the water depth had increased by about 18 inches (46 cm) between soundings, sending a wave of fear through the ship. As soon as the mistake was realised, redoubled efforts kept the pumps ahead of the leak.

The prospects if the ship sank were grim. The vessel was 24 miles (39 km) from shore and the three ship's boats could not carry the entire crew. Despite this, Banks noted in his journal the calm efficiency of the crew in the face of danger, contrary to stories he had heard of seamen panicking or refusing orders in such circumstances.

Midshipman Jonathon Monkhouse proposed fothering the ship, as he had previously been on a merchant ship which used the technique successfully. He was entrusted with supervising the task, sewing bits of oakum and wool into an old sail, which was then drawn under the ship to allow water pressure to force it into the hole in the hull. The effort succeeded and soon very little water was entering, allowing the crew to stop two of the three pumps.

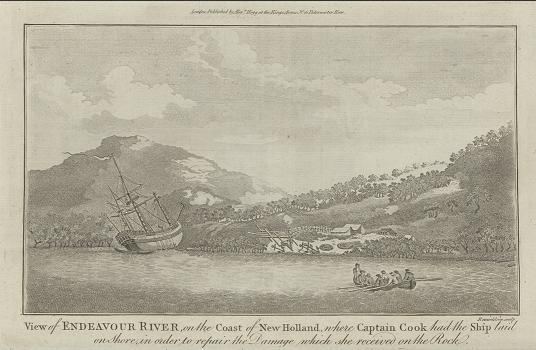
Endeavour beached at its namesake river, Endeavour River, for repairs after her grounding on the Great Barrier Reef in 1770. By Johann Fritzsch, published 1786.

Endeavour then resumed her course northward and parallel to the reef, the crew looking for a safe harbour in which to make repairs. On 13 June, the ship came to a broad watercourse that Cook named the Endeavour River. Cook attempted to enter the river mouth, but strong winds and rain prevented Endeavour from crossing the bar until the morning of 17 June. She grounded briefly on a sand spit but was refloated an hour later and warped into the river proper by early afternoon. The ship was promptly beached on the southern bank and careened to make repairs to the hull. Torn sails and rigging were also replaced and the hull scraped free of barnacles.

An examination of the hull showed that a piece of coral the size of a man's fist had cleanly sliced through the timbers before breaking off. Surrounded by pieces of oakum from the fother, this coral fragment had helped plug the hole in the hull and preserved the ship from sinking on the reef.

==== Northward to Batavia ====
After waiting for the wind, Endeavour resumed her voyage on the afternoon of 5 August 1770, reaching the northernmost point of Cape York Peninsula fifteen days later. On 22 August, Cook was rowed ashore to a small coastal island to proclaim British sovereignty over the eastern Australian mainland. Cook christened his landing place Possession Island, and ceremonial volleys of gunfire from the shore and Endeavour's deck marked the occasion.

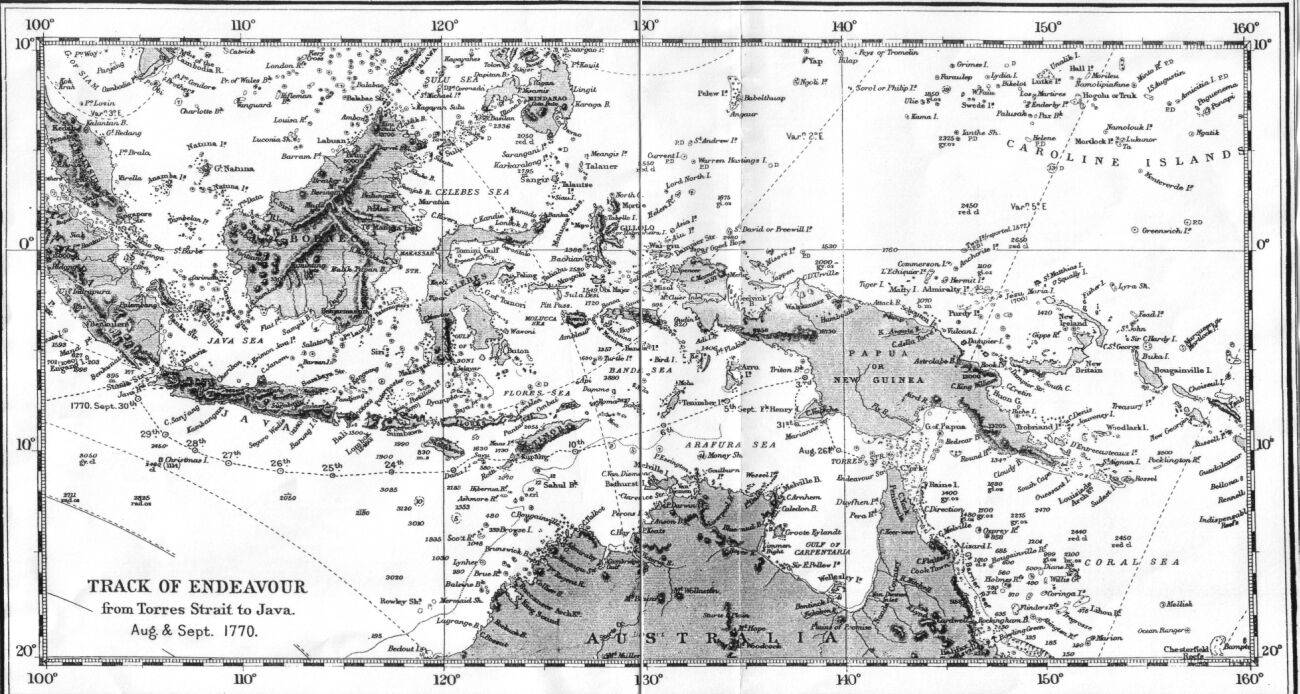
Route of Endeavour from the Torres Strait to Java, August and September 1770

Endeavour then resumed her voyage westward along the coast, picking a path through intermittent shoals and reefs with the help of the pinnace, which was rowed ahead to test the water depth. By 26 August she was out of sight of land, and had entered the open waters of the Torres Strait between Australia and New Guinea, earlier navigated by Luis Váez de Torres in 1606. To keep Endeavour's voyages and discoveries secret, Cook confiscated the log books and journals of all on board and ordered them to remain silent about where they had been.

After a three-day layover off the island of Savu, Endeavour sailed on to Batavia, the capital of the Dutch East Indies, on 10 October. A day later lightning during a sudden tropical storm struck the ship, but the rudimentary "electric chain" or lightning rod that Cook had ordered rigged to Endeavour's mast saved her from serious damage.

The ship remained in very poor condition following her grounding on the Great Barrier Reef in June. The ship's carpenter, John Seetterly, observed that she was "very leaky – makes from twelve to six inches an hour, occasioned by her main keel being wounded in many places, false keel gone from beyond the midships. Wounded on her larbord side where the greatest leak is but I could not come at it for the water." An inspection of the hull revealed that some unrepaired planks were cut through to within 1/8 inch (3.2 mm). Cook noted it was a "surprise to every one who saw her bottom how we had kept her above water" for the previous three-month voyage across open seas.

After riding at anchor for two weeks, Endeavour was heaved out of the water on 9 November and laid on her side for repairs. Some damaged timbers were found to be infested with shipworms, which required careful removal to ensure they did not spread throughout the hull. Broken timbers were replaced and the hull recaulked, scraped of shellfish and marine flora, and repainted. Finally, the rigging and pumps were renewed and fresh stores brought aboard for the return journey to England. Repairs and replenishment were completed by Christmas Day 1770, and the next day Endeavour weighed anchor and set sail westward towards the Indian Ocean.

==== Return voyage ====
Though Endeavour was now in good condition, her crew were not. During the ship's stay in Batavia, all but 10 of the 94 people aboard had been taken ill with malaria and dysentery. (Note: Some of Endeavour's crew also contracted an unspecified lung infection. Cook noted that disease of various kinds had broken out aboard every ship berthed in Batavia at the time, and that "this seems to have been a year of General sickness over most parts of India" and in England.) By the time Endeavour set sail on 26 December, seven crew members had died and another forty were too sick to attend their duties. Over the following twelve weeks, a further 23 died from disease and were buried at sea, including Spöring, Green, Parkinson, and the ship's surgeon William Monkhouse.

Cook attributed the sickness to polluted drinking water, and ordered that it be purified with lime juice, but this had little effect. Jonathan Monkhouse, who had proposed fothering the ship to save her from sinking on the reef, died on 6 February, followed six days later by ship's carpenter John Seetterly, whose skilled repair work in Australia had allowed Endeavour to resume her voyage. The health of the surviving crew members then slowly improved as the month progressed, with the last deaths from disease being three ordinary seamen on 27 February.

On 13 March 1771, Endeavour rounded the Cape of Good Hope and made port in Cape Town two days later. Those still sick were taken ashore for treatment. The ship remained in port for four weeks awaiting the recovery of the crew and undergoing minor repairs to her masts. On 15 April, the sick were brought back on board along with ten recruits from Cape Town, and Endeavour resumed her homeward voyage. The English mainland was sighted on 10 July and Endeavour entered the port of Dover two days later.

Approximately one month after his return, Cook was promoted to the rank of commander, and by November 1771 was in receipt of Admiralty Orders for a second expedition, this time aboard HMS Resolution. During his third voyage (second on Resolution), Cook was killed during his attempted kidnapping of the ruling chief of Hawaii at Kealakekua Bay on 14 February 1779.

=== Later service ===
While Cook was fêted for his successful voyage, Endeavour was largely forgotten. Within a week of her return to England, she was directed to Woolwich Dockyard for refitting as a naval transport. Under the command of Lieutenant James Gordon, she then made three return voyages to the Falkland Islands.

The first, under the command of sailing master John Dykes, was to deliver "sufficient provisions to serve 350 men to the end of the year 1772"; she sailed from Portsmouth on 8 November 1771, but due to terrible weather did not arrive at Port Egmont (the British base in the Falkland Islands) until 1 March. Endeavour sailed from Port Egmont on 4 May in a three-month non-stop voyage until she anchored at Portsmouth.

The second voyage was to reduce the garrison and replace HM Sloop Hound, John Burr Commander, with a smaller vessel, namely the 36-ton shallop Penguin, commander Samuel Clayton. She was a collapsible vessel and was no sooner built than taken apart, and the pieces were stowed in Endeavour. Endeavour sailed in November with Hugh Kirkland as the sailing master, and additionally the crew of Penguin, and four ship's carpenters whose job was to reassemble Penguin on arrival, which was 28 January 1773. On 17 April Endeavour and Hound sailed for England with their crew. One of Penguin's crew was Bernard Penrose who wrote an account. Samuel Clayton also wrote an account.

The third voyage sailed in January 1774 with her purpose to evacuate the Falklands entirely as Britain was faced with political difficulties from the American Colonies, the French and the Spanish. The government assessed that if British ships and troops were engaged in America, Spain might seize the Falklands, capturing the small garrison at Port Egmont with maybe loss of life – this, it was feared, would trigger an outcry which might topple the government. Endeavour left England in January 1774, sailing from the Falklands with all the British inhabitants on 23 April, leaving a flag and plaque confirming Britain's sovereignty.

Endeavour was paid off in September 1774, being sold in March 1775 by the Royal Navy to shipping magnate J. Mather for £645. Mather returned her to sea for at least one commercial voyage to Archangel in Russia.

Once the American War of Independence had commenced, the British government needed ships to carry troops and materiel across the Atlantic. In 1775 Mather submitted Endeavour as a transport ship, being rejected. Thinking that renaming her would fool Deptford Yard, Mather resubmitted Endeavour under the name Lord Sandwich. As Lord Sandwich she was rejected in no uncertain terms: "Unfit for service. She was sold out Service Called Endeavour Bark refused before". Repairs were made, with acceptance in her third submission, under the name Lord Sandwich 2 as there was already a transport ship called Lord Sandwich.

Lord Sandwich 2, master William Author, sailed on 6 May 1776 from Portsmouth in a fleet of 100 vessels, 68 of which were transports, which was under orders to support Howe's campaign to capture New York. Lord Sandwich 2 carried 206 men mainly from the Hessian du Corps regiment of Hessian mercenaries. The crossing was stormy, with two Hessians who were in the same fleet making accounts of the voyage. The scattered fleet assembled at Halifax then sailed to Sandy Hook where other ships and troops assembled. On 15 August 1776 Lord Sandwich 2 was anchored at Sandy Hook; also assembled there was Adventure, which had sailed with Resolution on Cook's second voyage, now a storeship, captained by John Hallum. Another ship there at that time was HMS Siren, captained by Tobias Furneaux, who had commanded Adventure on Cook's second voyage.

New York was eventually captured, but Newport, Rhode Island, remained in the hands of the Americans and posed a threat as a base for recapturing New York, so in November 1776 a fleet, which included Lord Sandwich 2 carrying Hessian troops, set out to take Rhode Island. The island was taken but not subdued, and Lord Sandwich 2 was needed as a prison ship.

== Final resting place ==
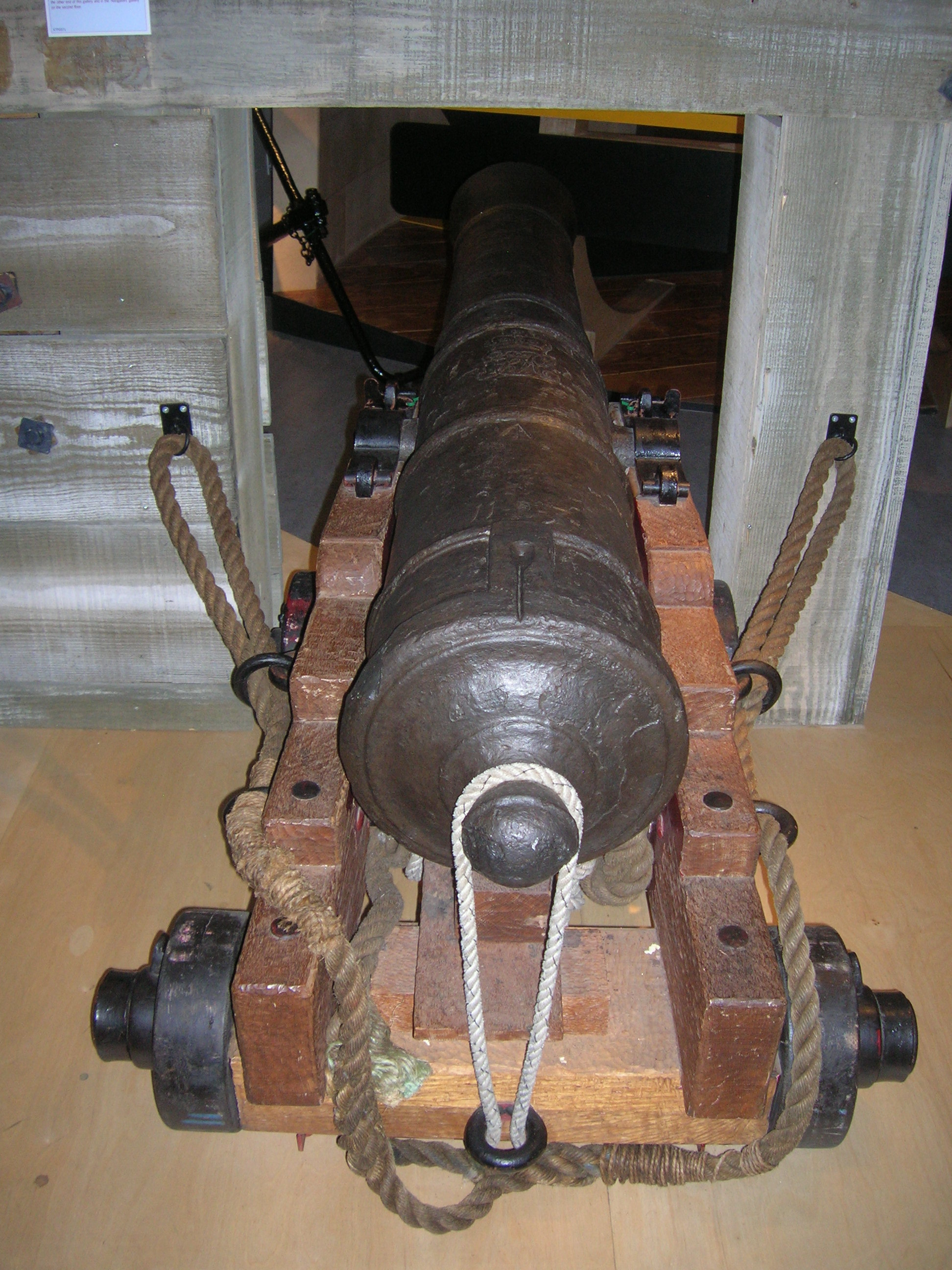
A recovered cannon from Endeavour on display at the National Maritime Museum in Greenwich, England

The surrender of British General John Burgoyne's army at Saratoga brought France into the war, and in the summer of 1778 a pincer plan was agreed to recapture Newport: the Continental Army would approach overland, and a French fleet would sail into the harbour. To prevent the latter the British commander, Captain John Brisbane, determined to blockade the bay by sinking surplus vessels at its mouth. Between 3 and 6 August a fleet of Royal Navy and hired craft, including Lord Sandwich 2, were scuttled at various locations in the Bay. (Note: A number of British vessels were sunk in local waters in the days leading up to the 29–30 August 1778, Battle of Rhode Island. These were the four Royal Navy frigates on 5 August along the coast of Aquidneck Island north of Newport: Juno 32, Lark 32, Orpheus 32, and Cerberus 28; the Royal Navy sloop of war Kingsfisher and galleys Alarm and Spitfire in the Sakonnet River on 30 July; the Royal Navy frigate Flora and sloop of war Falcon in Newport Harbour on 9 August; and ten of the thirteen privately owned British transports sunk in Newport Harbour between 3–5 August were Betty, Britannia, Earl of Oxford, Good Intent, Grand Duke of Russia, Lord Sandwich, Malaga, Rachel and Mary, Susanna, and Union.) Lord Sandwich 2, previously Endeavour, previously Earl of Pembroke, was sunk on 4 August 1778.

The owners of the sunken vessels were compensated by the British government for the loss of their ships. The Admiralty valuation for 10 of the sunken vessels recorded that many had been built in Yorkshire, and the details of the Lord Sandwich transport matched those of the former Endeavour including construction in Whitby, a burthen of 368 71/94 tons, and re-entry into Navy service on 10 February 1776.

In 1834 a letter appeared in the Providence Journal of Rhode Island, drawing attention to the possible presence of the former Endeavour on the seabed of the bay. This was swiftly disputed by the British consul in Rhode Island, who wrote claiming that Endeavour had been bought from Mather by the French in 1790 and renamed Liberté. The consul later admitted he had heard this not from the Admiralty, but as hearsay from the former owners of the French ship. It was later suggested Liberté, which sank off Newport in 1793, was in fact another of Cook's ships, the former HMS Resolution, or another Endeavour, a naval schooner sold out of service in 1782. A further letter to the Providence Journal stated that a retired English sailor was conducting guided tours of a hulk on the River Thames as late as 1825, claiming that the ship had once been Cook's Endeavour.

In 1991 the Rhode Island Marine Archaeology Project (RIMAP) began research into the identity of the thirteen transports sunk as part of the Newport blockade of 1778, including Lord Sandwich. In 1999 RIMAP discovered documents in the Public Record Office (now called the National Archives) in London confirming that Endeavour had been renamed Lord Sandwich, had served as a troop transport to North America, and had been scuttled at Newport as part of the 1778 fleet of transports.

In 1999, a combined research team from RIMAP and the Australian National Maritime Museum examined some known wrecks in the harbour and in 2000, RIMAP and the ANMM examined a site that appears to be one of the blockade vessels, partly covered by a separate wreck of a 20th-century barge. The older remains were those of a wooden vessel of approximately the same size, and possibly a similar design and materials as Lord Sandwich ex Endeavour. Confirmation that Cook's former ship had indeed been in Newport Harbor sparked public interest in locating her wreck. However, further mapping showed eight other 18th-century wrecks in Newport Harbor, some with features and conditions also consistent with Endeavour. In 2006 RIMAP announced that the wrecks were unlikely to be raised. In 2016 RIMAP concluded that there was a probability of 80 to 100% that the wreck of Endeavour was still in Newport Harbor, probably one of a cluster of five wrecks on the seafloor, and planned to investigate the ships and their artifacts further. They were seeking funds to build facilities for handling and storing recovered objects.

In September 2018, Fairfax Media reported that archaeologists from RIMAP had pinpointed the final resting place of the vessel. The possible discovery was hailed as a "hugely significant moment" in Australian history, but researchers have warned they were yet to "definitively" confirm whether the wreck had been located.

On 3 February 2022, the Australian National Maritime Museum (ANMM) held an event attended by federal cabinet minister Paul Fletcher to announce that the wreck had been confirmed to be that of the Endeavour. The RIMAP has called the announcement "premature" and a "breach of contract", which the ANMM denies. The RIMAP's lead investigator stated that "there has been no indisputable data found to prove the site is that iconic vessel, and there are many unanswered questions that could overturn such an identification". In November 2023, however, the ANMM announced further confirmative discoveries. Meanwhile, the wreck is being eaten by shipworms and gribbles.

In June 2025, The Australian National Maritime Museum and RIMAP released their final report confirming the wreck's identity as that of HMB Endeavour.

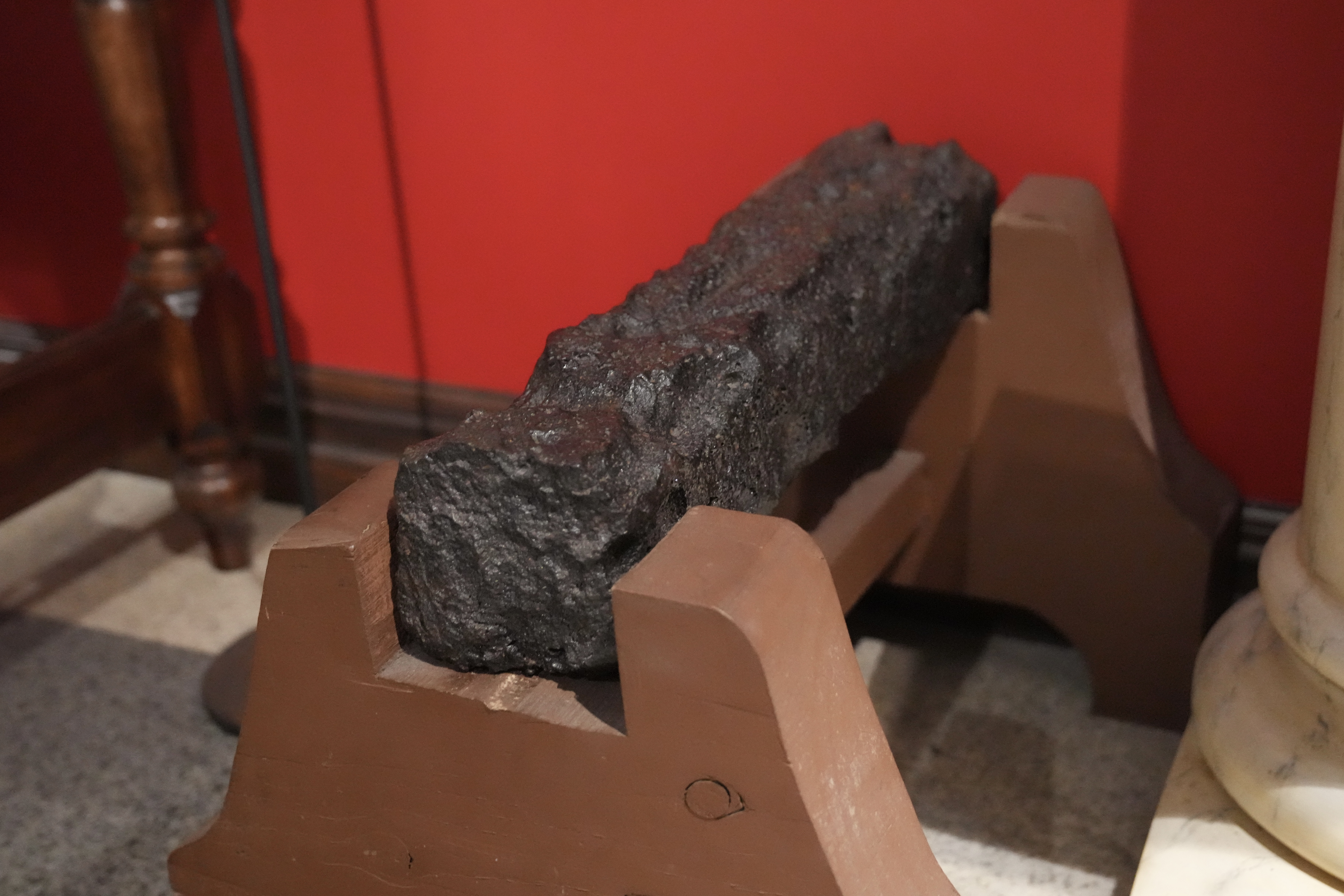
Pig iron ballast from Captain James Cook's HM Bark Endeavour in the New Zealand Maritime Museum. This piece of ballast was recovered from the Great Barrier Reef in Australia, where Endeavour had gone aground in 1770

== Endeavour relics and legacy ==
In addition to the search for the remains of the ship herself, there was substantial Australian interest in locating relics of the ship's south Pacific voyage. In 1886, the Working Men's Progress Association of Cooktown sought to recover the six cannon thrown overboard when Endeavour grounded on the Great Barrier Reef. A £300 reward was offered for anyone who could locate and recover the guns, but searches that year and the next were fruitless and the money went unclaimed. Remains of equipment left at Endeavour River were discovered in around 1900, and in 1913 the crew of a merchant steamer erroneously claimed to have recovered an Endeavour cannon from shallow water near the Reef.

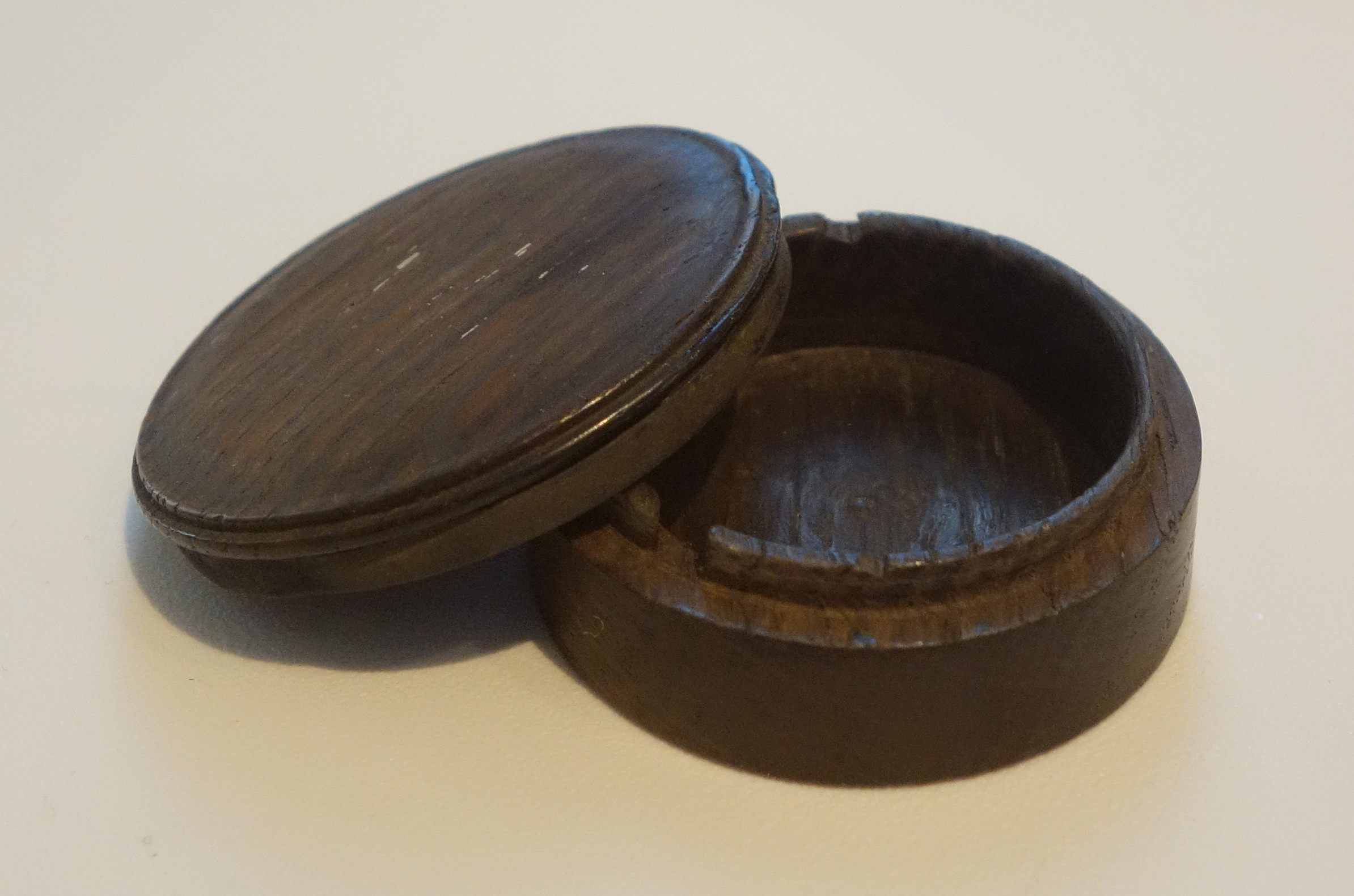
Box made from a piece of the Endeavour's keel, given to the East India Marine Society in Salem, Massachusetts, in 1815

Portions of the original keel of the Endeavour may have been made into souvenirs in the early 19th century. In 1815, Lieutenant James Armstrong of the U.S. Navy gave a small wooden box, said to have been made from a piece of the keel, to the East India Marine Society (now the Peabody Essex Museum) in Salem, Massachusetts. In 1937, a small part of Endeavour's keel was given to the Australian Government by philanthropist Charles Wakefield in his capacity as president of the Admiral Arthur Phillip Memorial. Australian Prime Minister Joseph Lyons described the section of keel as "intimately associated with the discovery and foundation of Australia".

Searches were resumed for the lost Endeavour Reef cannon, but expeditions in 1966, 1967, and 1968 were unsuccessful. They were finally recovered in 1969 by a research team from the American Academy of Natural Sciences, using a sophisticated magnetometer to locate the cannon, a quantity of iron ballast but not the abandoned bower anchor. Conservation work on the cannon was undertaken by the Australian National Maritime Museum, after which two of the cannon were displayed at its headquarters in Sydney's Darling Harbour, and eventually put on display at Botany Bay and the National Museum of Australia in Canberra (with a replica remaining at the museum). A third cannon, and the bower anchor recovered in 1971, were displayed at the James Cook Museum in Cooktown, with the remaining three at the National Maritime Museum in London, the Academy of Natural Sciences in Philadelphia, and the Museum of New Zealand Te Papa Tongarewa in Wellington.

Endeavour's Pacific voyage was further commemorated in the use of her image on the reverse of the New Zealand fifty-cent coin.

Apollo 15's command and service module CSM-112 was given the call sign Endeavour; astronaut David Scott explained the choice of the name on the grounds that its captain, Cook, had commanded the first purely scientific sea voyage, and Apollo 15 was the first lunar landing mission on which there was a heavy emphasis on science. Apollo 15 took with it a small piece of wood claimed to be from Cook's ship. The ship was again commemorated in the naming of the Space Shuttle Endeavour in 1989. The shuttle's name in turn inspired the naming of the SpaceX Crew Dragon Endeavour, the first such capsule to launch crew.

== Replica vessels ==
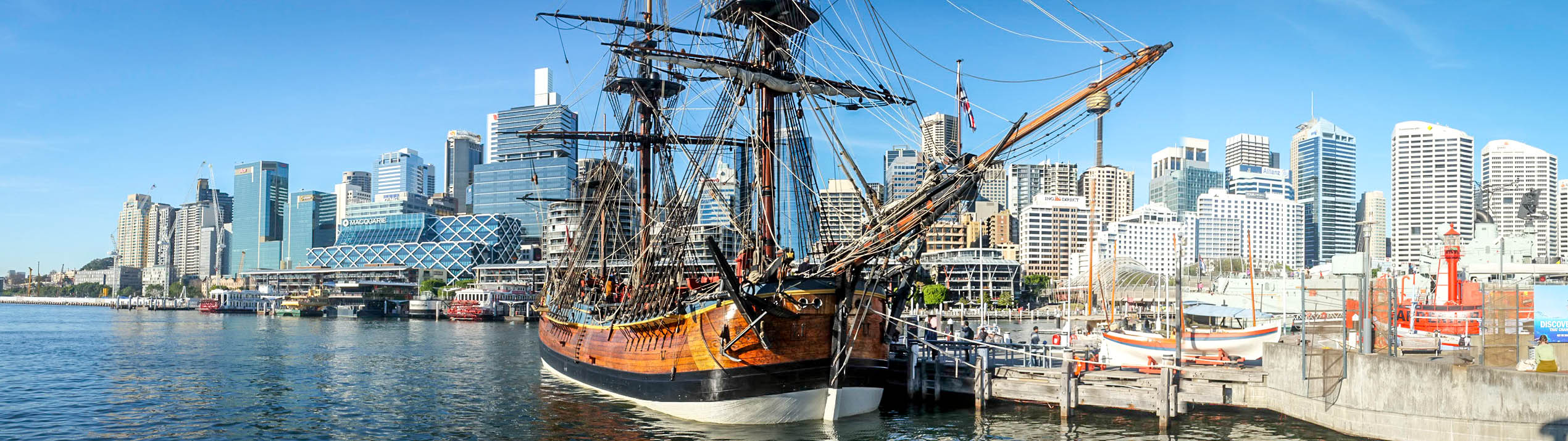
HM Bark Endeavour Replica. Australian National Maritime Museum, Sydney

In January 1988, to commemorate the Australian Bicentenary of European settlement in Australia, work began in Fremantle, Western Australia, on a replica of Endeavour. Financial difficulties delayed completion until December 1993, and the vessel was not commissioned until April 1994. The replica vessel commenced her maiden voyage in October of that year, sailing to Sydney Harbour and then following Cook's path from Botany Bay northward to Cooktown. From 1996 to 2002, the replica retraced Cook's ports of call around the world, arriving in the original Endeavour's home port of Whitby in May 1997 and June 2002. Footage of waves shot while rounding Cape Horn on this voyage was later used in digitally composited scenes in the 2003 film Master and Commander: The Far Side of the World.

The replica Endeavour visited various European ports before undertaking her final ocean voyage from Whitehaven to Sydney Harbour on 8 November 2004. Her arrival in Sydney was delayed when she ran aground in Botany Bay, a short distance from the point where Cook first set foot in Australia 235 years earlier. The replica Endeavour finally entered Sydney Harbour on 17 April 2005, having travelled 170,000 nautical miles (310,000 km), including twice around the world. Ownership of the replica was transferred to the Australian National Maritime Museum in 2005 for permanent service as a museum ship in Sydney's Darling Harbour.

A second full-size replica of Endeavour was berthed on the River Tees in Stockton-on-Tees before being moved to Whitby. While it reflects the external dimensions of Cook's vessel, this replica was constructed with a steel rather than a timber frame, has one less internal deck than the original, and is not designed to go to sea.

The Russell Museum, in the Bay of Islands, New Zealand, has a sailing one-fifth scale replica of Endeavour. It was built in Auckland in 1969 and travelled by trailer throughout New Zealand and Australia before being presented to the museum in 1970.

At Whitby the "Bark Endeavour Whitby" is a scaled-down replica of the original ship. It relies on engines for propulsion and is a little less than half the size of the original. Trips for tourists take them along the coast to Sandsend.

A 25-foot (7.6 m) replica of the ship is displayed in the Cleveland Centre, Middlesbrough, England.

== See also ==
- Blue Latitudes, a travel book by Tony Horwitz
- European and American voyages of scientific exploration
