= HMS Endeavour (1763 cutter) =

Cutter of the Royal Navy

History

Great Britain
- Name: HMS Endeavour
- Acquired: 14 February 1763
- Commissioned: April 1763
- Out of service: 24 December 1771
- Fate: Sold out of service

General characteristics
- Class & type: 4-gun cutter
- Tons burthen: 53 10/94 bm
- Length: 42 ft 3 in (12.9 m) (gundeck); 29 ft (8.8 m) (keel)
- Beam: 18 ft 10.5 in (5.8 m)
- Depth of hold: 7 ft 4 in (2.2 m)
- Propulsion: Sails
- Sail plan: Fore-and-aft rig
- Armament: 4 × 3 pdrs; 8 × 1/2 pdr swivel guns

HMS Endeavour was a 4-gun cutter of the Royal Navy, commissioned in 1763 and used for coastal patrol duties off Beachy Head in southern England. Endeavour was sold out of service in 1771.

== Bibliography ==
- Winfield, Rif (2007). British Warships of the Age of Sail 1714–1792: Design, Construction, Careers and Fates. Seaforth. ISBN 9781844157006.
