= Freaking =

Freaking may refer to:

- Freaking or grinding, a type of partner dance where two or more individuals gyrate their bodies against each other
- A minced oath for "fucking"; see Fuck § Common alternatives

== See also ==
- Freak, a person with strikingly unusual appearance or behaviour
- Freak (disambiguation)
- Freak out (disambiguation)
- Phreaking, manipulating telephone systems
- Seth "Freakin" Rollins, ring name of WWE Superstar Colby Lopez
