= Freek =

Freek or Freeks may refer to:

== Music ==
- Freek (album), a 1994 album by Keller Williams
- "Freek", a 2017 single by Tom Budin
- Freek FM, a pirate radio station that broadcasts UK garage
- Freek, a UAE-based Somali rapper

== Other uses ==
- Freek (given name), a male given name
- Freek, a character from Gamer
- Freeks, a 2017 novel by Amanda Hocking
- Freek, an energy drink from National Beverage
- FREEK, an energy drink label of Rip It
- Freek, a South African rugby player

== See also ==
- Freak (disambiguation)
- Freeek!, a 2002 song by George Michael
- Freq (disambiguation)
- Phreaking
- Phreek
