= Steven Dale Ahern =

American pornographic actor and whistleblower (1946–2011)

- Ahern in Jail House Rock, 1971
- Born: May 21, 1946; Glendale, California, U.S.
- Died: June 23, 2011 (aged 65); Los Angeles, California, U.S.
- Other names: Steve Ahern; Hal
- Political party: American Nazi Party (1964–1965)

Steven Dale Ahern (Note: Sometimes spelled as "Stephen") (May 21, 1946 – June 23, 2011) was an American gay pornographic actor and whistleblower.

Outside of Ahern's brief career in pornography, he is best known for his death threats against Robert F. Kennedy in 1968, his exposure of American Nazi Party members within the Long Beach Young Republicans in 1965, and his 1973 claim that serial killer Dean Corll was involved in a then-ongoing child pornography ring with record producer Roy Ames.

== Early life ==
Ahern at John H. Francis Polytechnic High School in 1963

Ahern was born on May 21, 1946, in Glendale, California.

He attended John H. Francis Polytechnic High School in Los Angeles and ran for student body president of the school in 1963. After graduation, he attended Los Angeles Valley College and served in the Marines.

== Exposal of ANP support in the Long Beach Young Republicans ==
Ahern claimed he was a member of the American Nazi Party from December 1964 to May 1965.

On December 1, 1965, California assemblyman George Deukmejian disclosed an affidavit signed by Ahern that accused George J. King Jr., the recently appointed Long Beach president of the Young Republicans, and corresponding secretary Ray Drake of being undercover ANP members aiming to infiltrate the Young Republican organization. Ahern alleged that he was present at a meeting in which the head of the ANP's California branch, Ralph Forbes, paid Drake $300 to fund their effort to take control of the Long Beach Young Republicans, which would then be followed by a takeover of their Orange County and San Diego clubs. A complete infiltration of these clubs was planned to culminate in the ANP "[controlling] the [state's] YRs by June 1, 1966".

King denied the allegations and refused a suggestion by Deukmejian to resign but admitted to holding anti-Semitic views and stated that he had attended three or four ANP meetings to gain information. Deukmejian cited a 1963 case in which King pled guilty to attempting to sell machine guns to federal agents posing as prospective Minutemen, a neo-Nazi organization King was a part of at that time. King was investigated once again by the FBI on November 22nd of that year, as he was alleged to have been involved in discussions about killing president John F. Kennedy. Forbes denied that he was interested in infiltrating the Young Republicans and claimed that Ahern had never been a member of the American Nazi Party. Forbes also rejected Ahern's reliability, citing a recent episode of The Louis Lomax Show in which Ahern appeared sporting a tin foil hat while claiming to be from Mars. On December 4, Ahern and King debated over the matter on The Joe Pyne Show. Forbes also said, "I don't even own a car and didn't have $30 to waste on some back water club".

On December 7, King and Drake were expelled from the Young Republicans. Preceding their expulsion by a couple of hours, the two attempted to resign from the organization, which was ignored. It was determined that King and Drake indeed had heavily supported anti-Semitic and pro-ANP causes. Their expulsion was praised by Barry Goldwater.

== Death threats against Robert F. Kennedy ==
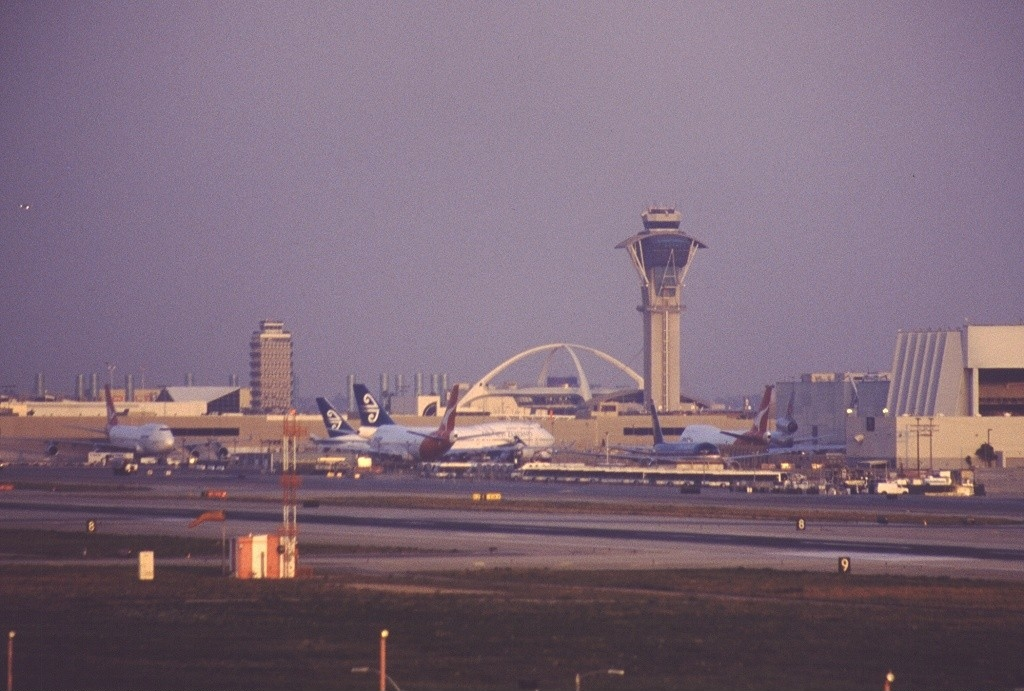
Los Angeles International Airport, where Ahern called in a death threat against Robert F. Kennedy in 1968, before driving there to shake his hand

In March 1968, Ahern made two phone calls from a phone booth in Sylmar, Los Angeles, in which he threatened Robert F. Kennedy. The first was to the Greek Theatre in Los Angeles, where Kennedy was to speak the following day. Ahern told the operator: "There is a bomb inside; it will go off tomorrow afternoon at 4:30 p.m." He then called the Los Angeles Times, announcing, "Senator Kennedy will be shot." The next day, he called American Airlines and stated, "Senator Kennedy will be shot when he lands." Immediately following this, he drove to Los Angeles International Airport, where he claimed to have shaken Kennedy's hand, before he drove to the Greek Theatre to peacefully attend his rally. He would go on to tell the FBI that he made the calls to see if they would create news.

On March 31, Ahern made an appointment with his psychiatrist to "explain that he had an urge to kill Senator Kennedy for some reason, which he was unable to explain within himself". Upon hearing this, his psychiatrist reported it to Ahern's probation officer. Ahern was then interviewed by two court-appointed psychiatrists who determined that he was legally sane, after which he was sentenced to three years of active probation. On February 7, 1969, he was committed to a state hospital.

== Pornography career ==
In the early 1970s, Ahern had a brief career as a gay pornographic model. He looked up to Mattachine Society president Hal Call, writing in a 1971 letter to him: "You will never know how much you have helped me and the difference you made in me [sic] life."

== Roy Ames and Dean Corll ==
Following the death and public exposure of child murderer Dean Corll in August 1973, Ahern sent a letter to police explaining that male child pornography was a large industry in Houston. He wrote that Corll was involved in the scene and that he could point to some of Corll's victims in the magazines 7 Up #1, Bonanza #2, Gayboy #3–6, Hot Rods #3, and More Than 7 Inches #4. He also claimed that Corll had connections to Roy Ames, a prolific child pornographer active in Houston, and that Ames had accessed boys through Corll. (Note: Houston Police later noted that Ames' contact information was found on a card in Corll's wallet, but did not confirm any further connection.) Ahern told police that in 1971, after putting an ad in The Advocate for pornographic modeling, he was flown out to Houston by Ames. There, he claimed to have been invited by the two to a sex party at Corll's home. Two of Corll's victims, brothers Donald and Jerry Waldrop, were alleged by their father to have been in the company of Ames. Additionally, Ahern estimated that Ames had produced 90% of child pornography in the Houston area and 30% circulating throughout the country. After Houston PD investigators spoke with Ahern, they did not look further into the possibility of a link between Ames and Corll, though they were convinced that there was a "good possibility" Corll victim William Lawrence was in Hot Rods #3.

In February 1975, Houston police discovered a warehouse full of pornographic films and photographs of underage boys, eleven of whom appeared to be known victims of Corll. This discovery led to the arrest of the warehouse's owner, Roy Ames. Despite this, Houston police declined to look further into an Ames–Corll connection, stating that the families of Corll's victims had "suffered enough".

== Later life and death ==
Throughout the 1970s and 1980s, Ahern would frequently send readers' letters to newspapers such as the Los Angeles Times. His writings often discussed societal issues from a conservative angle and included praise for Richard Nixon.

Ahern died on a bike path at the age of 65 on June 23, 2011, in Woodland Hills, Los Angeles. His cause of death was listed as coronary artery disease with methamphetamine use and hypertrophic heart disease as contributing factors.

== Filmography ==
Ahern starred in at least five pornographic movies between 1971 and 1972:

- Hal and Conrad (1971, Visual Information and Education)
- Jail House Rock (1971, Telstar Productions)
- Crowbar Crew (1972, Le Salon Video)
- Let's Beat Off (1972, Grand Prix Photo Arts)
- Solo by Steve (c. 1972, Grand Prix Photo Arts)

== Television appearances ==
- The Joe Pyne Show, May 15, 1965
- The Louis Lomax Show, c. October 1965
- The Joe Pyne Show, December 4, 1965

== Cited works ==
- Jeffers, Paul (1992). Profiles in Evil: Chilling Case Histories from the Files of the FBI's Violent Crime Unit. London: Time Warner Books UK. ISBN 978-0-751-50778-2.
- Ramsland, Katherine; Ullman, Tracy (2024). The Serial Killer's Apprentice. New York City: Crime Ink. ISBN 978-1613164952.
- Sanders, Ed (2018). Broken Glory: The Final Years of Robert F. Kennedy. New York City: Arcade Publishing. ISBN 9781628729528.
- Sears, James (2006). Behind the Mask of the Mattachine. New York City: Routledge. ISBN 9781560231875.
