= Freaked Out =

Freaked Out may refer to:

- "Freaked Out" (song), a 2026 song by Fat Papi and prodshushy
- Freaked Out, a 2004 novel by Alice Alfonsi in the Lizzie McGuire series
- Freaked Out, a 2006 novel in the Beacon Street Girls series
- Freaked Out, a 2013 comedy special by Tom Papa

== See also ==
- Freak Out (disambiguation)
