= Roy Ames =

Record producer and convicted criminal (1937–2003)

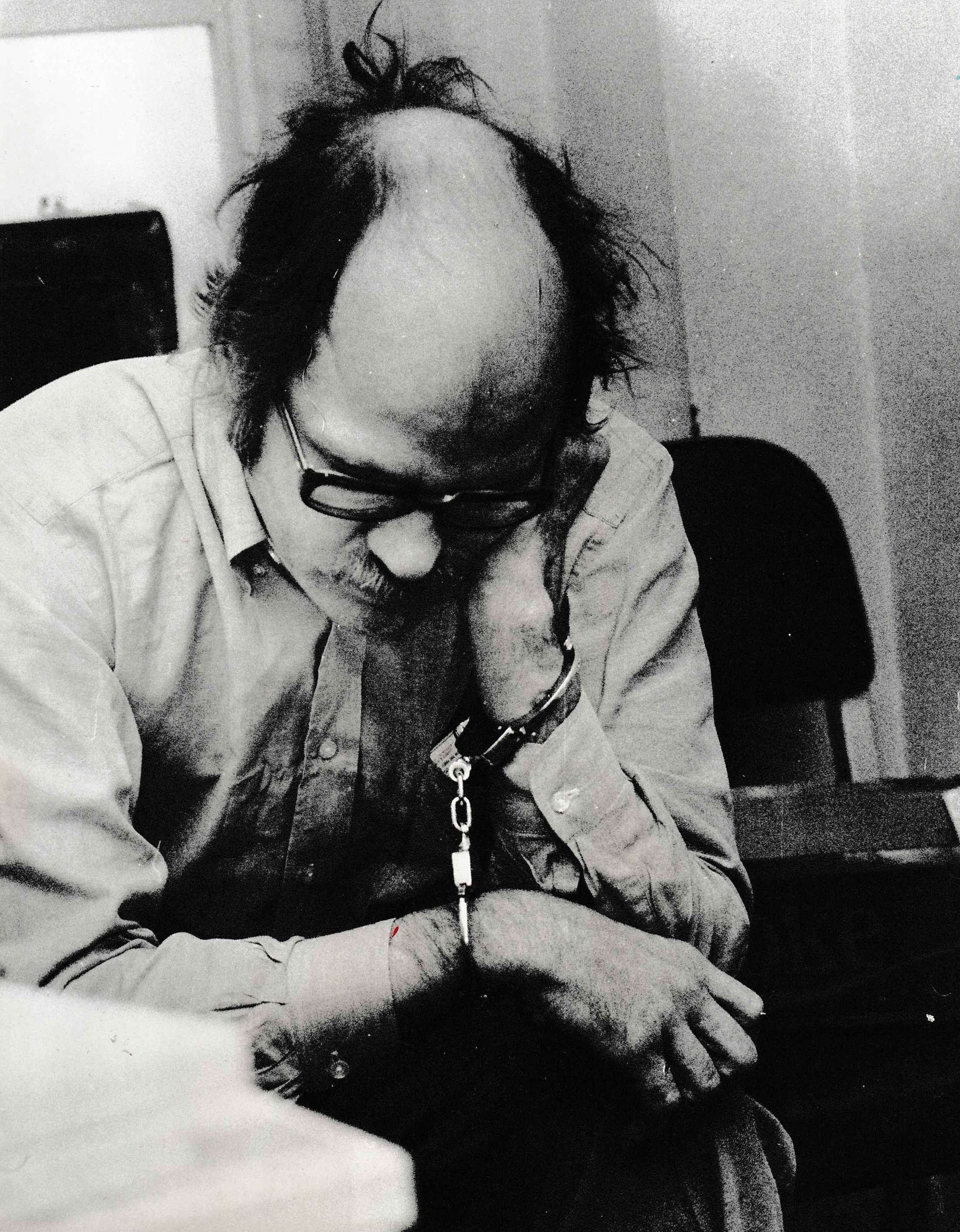
- Ames in police custody, 1975
- Born: Roy Clifton Ames; April 8, 1937; Beaumont, Texas, U.S.
- Died: August 14, 2003 (aged 66); West University Place, Texas, U.S.
- Other names: "Sweets"; Roy Clifford Ames; Mark Brunstein; John Jennings
- Occupations: Music producer; child pornographer; magazine publisher
- Musical career
- Years active: 1959–2003
- Labels: Aura Records; Clarity Music; Home Cooking Records

Roy Clifton Ames (Note: His middle name is sometimes mistaken as Clifford, and his last name is sometimes mistakenly spelled as Aimes.) (April 8, 1937 – August 14, 2003) was an American record producer and convicted child pornographer. As a producer, Ames was prominent in the Texas blues scene and was most famous for signing musician Johnny Winter in the mid-1960s. As a criminal, Ames was arrested multiple times for producing and distributing child pornography involving young boys. He was also known for his alleged ties to serial killer Dean Corll and some of his victims.

During a 1977 United States Senate subcommittee hearing, gay rights activist and sex offender Guy Strait testified that Ames was one of four major producers of child pornography in the 1970s. (Note: The other three being himself, Jerry Richards, and a man named "Walter" operating in the New Jersey area.)

== Early life ==
Roy Clifton Ames was born on April 8, 1937, to Raymond and Valorie Ames in Beaumont, Texas. He graduated from Beaumont High School in 1955 and initially worked at his father's car dealership.

== Music career ==
Ames entered the music industry in 1959 as the Texas sales manager for King Records, eventually moving on to the Motown label. A few years later, he became a promoter and distributor for Duke Records. Ames founded his own label, Aura Records, in the mid- to late-1960s; the names of his record labels changed throughout the latter half of the decade, with his most well-known being Clarity Music. During his tenure as a producer, Ames would record songs with various Texas blues artists, often with dodgy contracts. Some of the artists he cut tracks with included Jimmy Nelson, Hop Wilson, Juke Boy Bonner, and, most famously, Johnny Winter.

=== Johnny Winter ===
In 1963, after a brief but successful stint in Chicago, Winter returned to his home state of Texas. He soon encountered Ames, who signed Winter to Duke Records, apparently promising access to Don Robey's Houston-based record labels. The two began recording songs using the studio of Houston-based producer and Ames' collaborator, Huey P. Meaux. Winter later claimed that he never met Meaux, himself later convicted of child sex offenses; he and Ames worked together on producing some of Winter's songs, with Meaux making copies of the records and putting out his own versions concurrently with Ames. Winter and Ames went on to produce many songs and albums together, oftentimes under interchanging band names. Some of the work they produced was Gone for Bad, Leavin' Blues, and Comin' Up Fast.

Ames worked with Winter until the singer left Texas in the early 1970s, specifically to get away from Ames: "He was my manager but never got anything done as far as my career; he just got a percentage of my records. Roy was also a pornographic artist—he took pictures of little boys to sell to perverts. He did that all the time, even when he was doing records. I don't think he ever stopped taking pictures. We recorded some songs for Roy but never made a penny. He said he was putting too much money into promotion and wasn't recouping enough back." Winter subsequently moved to New York City.

== Early crimes ==
On August 28, 1964, Ames was found to be in possession of lewd photos, resulting in a $100 fine. He was arrested again on July 13, 1965, after police received information that he was taking nude photographs of young boys, for which he was not charged. Two months later, on September 14, Ames was arrested on a warrant from Waller County for writing a worthless check. He was arrested for shoplifting on February 29, 1966, for which he made bond the following day.

On April 3, 1968, the Federal Bureau of Investigation (FBI) launched an investigation into Ames when a thirty-seven-pound package of lewd pamphlets broke open while it was being moved through Love Field airport. The employee handling the package reported its contents to authorities, leading to the FBI's Dallas field office getting involved. Authorities taped up the box and allowed it to reach its intended destination in Houston. On November 26, 1968, the United States Attorney in Houston stated he would take no action in the case and ordered the evidence to be disposed of.

== Alleged ties to Dean Corll ==
On December 22, 1973, a phone call was made to the Houston Police Department (HPD) from a probation officer from California on behalf of a 25-year-old inmate named Richard Van Payne. Officers were told that Payne had been in a warehouse in Houston, where he claimed to have seen photographs of the teenaged boys and young men murdered by serial killer Dean Corll. Five days before the HPD received the tip, Ames had been arrested for sending child pornography through the mail. His arrest resulted in the seizure of approximately four tons of child pornography from his warehouse at 406 Oxford Street, Houston. Ames' arrest followed a series of similar arrests in light of the Corll investigation, resulting in one of the largest takedowns of its time in Los Angeles in October 1973. Ames considered the subjects arrested to be "small time" compared to the scope of his operation.

=== The Waldrop Brothers ===
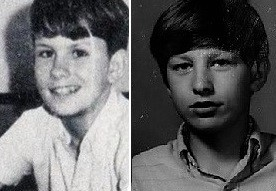
Corll victims Donald and Jerry Waldrop

On February 8, 1971, Everett Waldrop, the father of Corll victims Jerry and Donald Waldrop, contacted the HPD and stated in his missing persons report that he believed his sons were with Ames. On February 18, officers attempted to talk to Ames after pulling his rap sheet, which included three traffic violations. They then followed up on the address for the traffic warrants, leading them to "Pierre Cook and Associates, Photographers". They spoke to the owner, who said he did not know Ames but received his mail and bills. From there, the HPD labeled the case as inactive. Waldrop called police again on March 7, reporting that he had received a telephone number from a reliable source and called a man named Bill Walls. During the call, he claimed that he heard a sex party in the background and to have heard one of his sons speaking. He gave an address to police, who found that it was not in the area that Waldrop claimed it was.

The Waldrop brothers were eventually recovered from a mass grave under Corll's boat shed on August 9, 1973, and were eventually identified through dental records. A partially filled-out HPD offense report was found with one of these bodies. That same day, Everett Waldrop called the HPD wondering if his sons may be in the mass grave. He reiterated to officers that his sons were mixed up with Ames and Walls and that he was unable to stop them. The Waldrop brothers' causes of death were ruled as asphyxiation.

=== Steven Dale Ahern allegations ===
On August 31, 1973, police began investigating a lead sent to them from a letter postmarked August 24 from a California man named Steven Dale Ahern, who was a homosexual prostitute and pornographic model. In his letter, Ahern alleged the existence of a large organization in Houston producing pornographic material involving children, stating that he would be able to identify Corll victims in these magazines. He further stated that in 1971, he had been flown out to Houston with his fare paid to meet Ames and his partner, Charles Anson, after putting a classified ad in the gay magazine The Advocate. Ahern was photographed by Anson and stayed the night with him and Ames. He claimed that Ames knew Dean Corll and used him to exploit young boys.

Officers gathered the publications mentioned by Ahern and found what they believed to be Corll victim William Lawrence on the second page of Hot Rods #3, a pornographic magazine published by Ames. Lawrence's father came into the station to identify the photo but said it was not his dead son. Police, however, felt there was a strong possibility that it was. The HPD contacted the Los Angeles Police Department to ask about Ahern, who confirmed that he knew of him and that some of his information was accurate. The HPD then directly contacted Ahern, who furnished more details. Ahern repeated the contents of his letter but added that in 1971, he was invited to an alleged S&M party by Ames and Corll at the latter's apartment in Pasadena, Texas. He further stated that he believed Ames took 30% of the pornographic photos that were circulating around the country and was responsible for around 90% in the Houston area.

=== 1975 warehouse raid ===
In February 1975, HPD officers were tracking down a stolen bicycle when they accidentally stumbled upon a warehouse full of pornographic material involving young boys. Between two and six tons of material were seized, including 1,000 pieces of literature, 1,000 reels of film, and 15,000 photographic slides. Police reported that the boys photographed ranged from eight years old to late teens, some of whom had since grown to adults, indicating that the ring responsible had been in operation for quite some time. Police were able to identify thirty-two of the boys depicted in the photographs, eleven of whom appeared to be victims of Corll. Police elected to not follow up on the lead, with the head juvenile officer stating, "The parents of the boys have suffered enough; there would be problems with positive identification; and we had the leader of the porno ring anyway."

The discovery of the warehouse resulted in Ames' arrest in March 1975, along with four other men out in Santa Clara, California, including a high school teacher and photographer who had been running an operation for more than ten years. Ames was discovered to have operated direct mail services in Beverly Hills and San Francisco through his firm, New Atlas Distributors. Ames was held on a $150,000 bond, facing two counts of sexually abusing children and one count of employing a child to sell and distribute pornographic literature.

Ames was arrested again in April 1975, this time at a warehouse located at 4932 Glenmont, Houston, where two tons of child pornography were seized. Ames was charged with mailing obscene material and forcing boys into prostitution. He pleaded guilty to federal charges of mailing obscene films and magazines involving homosexual acts with young boys on July 25. In court, Assistant United States Attorneys Scott Campbell and Ronald J. Waska said that the government had evidence that Ames recruited boys from the Houston area and paid them to perform homosexual acts with each other and with adults while Ames filmed and photographed them. Campbell also stated that Ames was a national distributor of obscene material based in Houston. Ames' sentencing was set for August 25. He would be free on a $310,000 bond in the interim before eventually being sentenced to a federal prison in Springfield, Missouri. When sentenced, Ames laughed at the notion that his incarceration would impact the operation of his business.

It is still debated whether or not Corll had any meaningful link to larger child pornography and trafficking networks, including Ames' operation. Regardless of the veracity of the links, the arrests related to child pornography and trafficking in response to Corll's murders would spur on public outcry that led to government hearings on the subject of child exploitation in 1977. New laws specifically targeted towards combating child exploitation in all of its forms were passed as a result of these hearings.

In 1993, Susan McLemore, the younger sister of Corll victim Willard Branch, mentioned that while attending a party at Corll's home, she recalled observing four men who were often in his bedroom. Though she could not remember the fourth man, reporter Evan Moore mentioned that he thought one name mentioned in the 1973 police report, which was Ames, matched the man.

== 1981 arrest ==
On March 19, 1981, Ames was indicted by a federal grand jury on a single count of interstate transport of an obscene film after he sent a pornographic film featuring two boys under the age of 16 to an informant in Springfield, Massachusetts. The informant then led U.S. Customs agents to the mailbox containing the parcel sent by Ames. On March 24, Ames was arrested in a Houston parking lot when he tried to sell twenty-five pornographic films to undercover Customs and Postal Service agents. Ames faced up to ten years in prison and $10,000 in fines. He was held on a $100,000 bail while awaiting a removal hearing on April 2 to determine if he would be extradited to Massachusetts.

Ames was extradited to Massachusetts, where he would go on trial. Isaac Peyton Sweat, a former bassist for Johnny Winter, testified that he was aware of Ames' pornography stash in his Houston warehouse but advised him against selling it. Ames had planned to use the proceeds to finance Sweat's career. A man by the name of Jim Dolan acted as an intermediary between Ames and undercover agents. A $700 check endorsed by Ames to facilitate the purchase was used as evidence against him in court. The trial concluded on May 22, with Ames' conviction on all counts. On June 15, he was sentenced to five years in prison. Sweat was later found dead of a gunshot wound in his garage on June 23, 1990.

On July 26, 1983, Ames issued an appeal to reduce or end his sentence, claiming that it was illegally imposed. On July 29, the courts rejected his appeal, stating that they found his sentencing to be fair and reasonable. He attempted another appeal on June 8, 1984, this time adding that he believed his conviction by the district court was unjust since it relied on "an ex parte report forwarded to the Parole Commission, which contained material misrepresentations as to [the] appellant's identity and character" and therefore was illegal. The court disagreed with his assessment, and on September 12, they again rejected his appeal.

== Music lawsuits ==
Following his parole in 1986, Ames did not incur further charges relating to child pornography or similar offenses. With his newfound freedom, he attempted to make a comeback in the Texas blues scene, amassing a collection of over 8,000 master tapes and various pieces of vintage memorabilia that he started to sell under his new label, Home Cooking Records.

In the early 1990s, numerous artists and their surviving relatives filed a class action lawsuit against Ames for the unlawful use of their images and music. Multiple plaintiffs had accidentally stumbled across Ames' compilations; one such person was the widow of the then-deceased Hop Wilson, after a blues fan pointed out that her late husband's songs were being sold by Ames' label. Many other artists, including Joe Hughes and Juke Boy Bonner, made similar discoveries. Juries in both Dallas and Houston returned verdicts against Ames, forcing him to pay $260,781 in damages to the plaintiffs, plus an additional $110,559 awarded to the estate of Freddie King.

It was revealed during the lawsuit that Ames would often not sign his artists to a proper contract and used demo recordings that he copyrighted and sold as part of his catalogue, even to overseas outfits, all without paying royalties to the artists. This was a practice common in the blues scene, but Ames' case set a new legal precedent against these practices. Ames also sold unauthorized memorabilia, such as a supposed vintage concert poster featuring Hughes. Hughes claimed that the poster was a complete fraud, citing the use of "Guitar" in his stage name before he began using it in 1985.

Johnny Winter commented on the ordeal, saying that "Roy Ames is the worst" and adding, "When I see Roy's name on [an album], I know it's going to be trouble. If he put it together nobody is going to see a cent of it, except him that's for damned sure. This guy has screwed so many people it makes me mad to even talk about Roy. It's hard for me. My lawyer always says, 'You'll never get anything from the guy. He's so dishonest and so hard to track down that even if you sue him and win, getting the money is a whole different thing.' Maybe things have changed. I hope they have; maybe we can get him."

== Later life and death ==
Starting in 1990, Ames was arrested multiple times for DWI offenses. In December 1998, he received his third DWI and pleaded guilty, subsequently suspending his license for two years and leaving him on community supervision for a ten-year period. In September 2000, Ames received his last conviction for driving with a suspended license.

On August 14, 2003, at the age of 66, Roy Ames died of natural causes at his home in West University, Texas. He left behind no heirs. Upon hearing the news of Ames' passing, Johnny Winter would comment, "He died unhappy—at least that's good", adding, "He died out of jail though, which is amazing. It's funny he didn't die of AIDS, as promiscuous as he was."

== See also ==
- John David Norman
- Claudius Vermilye

== Cited works ==
- Herzhaft, Gérard (1992). Encyclopedia of the Blues. Fayetteville, Arkansas: University of Arkansas Press. ISBN 978-1-55728-252-1.
- Lloyd, Robin (1976). For Money or Love: Boy Prostitution in America. New York City: Ballantine Books. ISBN 0-8149-0773-3.
- Olsen, Lise (2025). The Scientist and The Serial Killer. New York City: Penguin Random House. ISBN 978-0593595695.
- Ramsland, Katherine; Ullman, Tracy (2024). The Serial Killer's Apprentice. New York City: Crime Ink. ISBN 978-1613164952.
- Silver Lake Editors (2002). The Value of a Good Idea: Protecting Intellectual Property in an Information Economy. Aberdeen, Washington: Silver Lake Publishing. ISBN 978-1-56343-745-8.
- Sullivan, Mary Lou (2010). Raisin' Cain: The Wild and Raucous Story of Johnny Winter. New York City: Backbeat Books. ISBN 978-0879309732.
