= Aberration =

An aberration is something that deviates from the normal way.

Aberration may also refer to:

== Biology and medicine ==
- Form (zoology) or aberration, a rare mutant butterfly or moth wing pattern
- Cardiac aberrancy, aberration in the shape of the EKG signal
- Chromosome aberration, abnormal number or structure of chromosomes

== Entertainment ==
- Aberration, a DLC for the video game Ark: Survival Evolved
- Aberration (film), a 1997 horror film
- Aberration (EP), by Neurosis, 1989
- Aberrations, or abbies, human-like creatures in the American TV series Wayward Pines

== Optics and physics ==
- Astronomical aberration, phenomenon wherein objects appear to move about their true positions in the sky
- Chromatic aberration, failure of a lens to focus all colors on the same point
- Defocus aberration, in which an image is out of focus
- Optical aberration, an imperfection in image formation by an optical system
- Relativistic aberration, the distortion of light at high velocities
- Spherical aberration, which occurs when light rays pass through a spherical lens near the edge

== See also ==
- Aberrant (role-playing game), a superhero role-playing game by White Wolf Game Studio
- Aberrancy (geometry), the non-circularity of a curve
- Abomination (Bible), a term used in Bible
- Freak (disambiguation)
- Monster
