= Freak (disambiguation) =

Freak has several meanings: a person who is physically deformed or has an extraordinary disease or condition, a genetic mutation in a plant or animal, etc.

Freak, freaks or The Freak may also refer to:

== Fictional characters ==
- Freak (Image Comics), in the Spawn comic book series
- Freak (Happy Hogan), a Marvel Comics character in Iron Man comics
- Freak (Eddie March), a Marvel Comics character in Iron Man comics
- Freak (Spider-Man villain), a Marvel Comics comic book character
- Freak (DC Comics), a member of Doom Patrol
- Joan Ferguson (Prisoner character) nicknamed "The Freak" a corrections officer, in the Australian soap opera Prisoner
- Joan Ferguson (Wentworth) The Freak, a corrections officer, in the Australian television series Wentworth
- Freak, the title character of Freak the Mighty, (1993) a young adult novel by Rodman Philbrick

== Stage and screen ==
- Freaks (1932 film), a horror film
- Freaks (2018 film), a sci-fi thriller film
- Freaks: You're One of Us, a 2020 German film distributed by Netflix
- Freak (play), a 1998 solo show by John Leguizamo
  - Freak (film), a 1998 film based on the Leguizamo play
- Freak (online drama), an online teen drama for MySpace by FremantleMedia
- "Freak", an episode of Freaky

== Music ==
- Freaks (band), an English electronic band
- Freak Recordings, a British record label
- Bonzo Dog Freaks or Freaks, an English band featuring Vivian Stanshall
- "Freak Me", a 1992 single by Silk
- BBC Radio 6 Music's Freak Zone

=== Albums ===
- Freak (Joker Xue album), 2018
- Freaks (Pulp album), 1987
- Freaks (Qoph album), or the title track, 2012
- Freaks (X Marks the Pedwalk album), 1992
- Freaks, by Fisher, or the title track, 2020

=== Songs ===
- "Freak" (Bruce Foxton song), 1983
- "Freak" (Doja Cat song), 2020
- "Freak" (Estelle song), 2010
- "Freak" (Lana Del Rey song), 2015
- "Freak" (Silverchair song), 1997
- "Freak" (The Smashing Pumpkins song), 2010
- "Freaks" (French Montana song), 2013
- "Freaks" (Live song), 1997
- "Freaks" (Marillion song), 1985
- "Freaks" (Surf Curse song), 2013
- "Freaks" (Timmy Trumpet and Savage song), 2014
- "Le Freak", by Chic, 1979
- "Freak", by Ant Clemons, 2020
- "Freak", by Ariana Grande from Petal, 2026
- "Freak", by Avicii from Tim, 2019
- "Freak", by Belle & Sebastian from Storytelling, 2002
- "Freak", by Chris Brown from 11:11 (Deluxe), 2024
- "Freak", by Days of the New from Days of the New, 1997
- "Freak", by Demi Lovato and Yungblud from Holy Fvck, 2022
- "Freak", by Klaas and Bodybangers, 2010
- "Freak", by Lexy & K-Paul, 2000
- "Freak", by Little Mix from Glory Days, 2016
- "Freak", by Rosabel, 2017
- "Freak", by Seaway from Colour Blind, 2015
- "Freak", by Swans from Filth, 1983
- "Freak", by Tyga and Megan Thee Stallion, 2020
- "Freak", by Yseult and JT, 2026
- "Freaks", by Soul Asylum from While You Were Out, 1986
- "Freaks", by Vicious from Destination Brooklyn, 1994
- "Freaks", by Haute and Freddy, 2026

== People ==
- Charles Freak (1847–1910), British trade unionist
- Jevon Kearse (born 1976), American former National Football League player nicknamed "the Freak"
- Tim Lincecum (born 1984), American former Major League Baseball pitcher nicknamed "the Freak"
- Freak (Wally Kozielski), rock and roll radio jock in Chicago's "southland"

== Other uses ==
- FREAK, a security exploit against web encryption
- Freaks (manga), a 2002 Japanese manga series
- Calinaga buddha or freak, a brush-footed butterfly species
- A minced oath for fuck

== See also ==
- Aberration (disambiguation)
- Freak folk, a genre of folk music
- Giannis Antetokounmpo (born 1994), National Basketball Association player nicknamed the "Greek Freak"
- Freak Nasty, American hip hop musician
- Freaked Out (disambiguation)
- Freak Out (disambiguation)
- Freak scene, various subcultures starting in the 1960s
- Freaked, a 1993 film
- Freaked!, a 2006 DC Talk tribute album
- Freax or Linux, an operating system
- Freek (disambiguation)
- Freex, a 1993 Malibu Comics series
- "FreaXXX", a track from the 2009 album I'm Not a Fan, But the Kids Like It! by Brokencyde
- Freke (disambiguation)
- Freq (disambiguation)
- Phreaking, a subculture of people who study, experiment with, or explore telecommunication systems
- Phreek, a disco and post-disco musical group also known as Class Action
- Phreex, a fictional island in The Wonderful Wizard of Oz
