= Freak Out =

Freak Out may refer to:

== Film and TV ==
- Freak Out (film), a 2004 British horror-comedy film
- Freak Out (TV series), an ABC Family original series
- Freak Out, a film by Brad Jones loosely based on the last night of Dean Corll

== Games ==
- Freak Out: Extreme Freeride, a 2007 skiing game
- Stretch Panic or Freak Out, a PlayStation 2 video game

== Music ==
=== Albums ===
- Freak Out!, an album by the Mothers of Invention
- Freak Out! (Teenage Bottlerocket album)
- Freak Out: The Greatest Hits of Chic and Sister Sledge
- Freak Out, an album by Tehosekoitin

=== Songs ===
- "Le Freak" or "Freak Out", a song by Chic
- "Freak Out", a song by 311 from Music
- "Freak Out", a song by Avril Lavigne from Under My Skin
- "Freak Out", a song by Cuban Link (featuring Angie Martinez) from 24K
- "Freak Out", a song by September from Dancing Shoes
- "Freak Out", a song by Liars from Liars
- "Freak Out", a song by B*Witched from B*Witched
- "Freaking Out", a song by Adema from Adema

== Other uses ==
- Freak-out (slang), a 1960s counterculture term
- Freak Out! (magazine), a Peruvian music magazine
- Freak Out USA, a 1967 magazine by Warren Publishing
- Freak Out (ride), a pendulum-based fairground ride
- Freakout Festival, annual music festival

== See also ==
- Operation Freakout, a campaign by Scientology to silence a critic
- Freaked Out (disambiguation)
- I Freak Out, an extended play by The Hard Aches
- Freak Out, It's Ben Kweller, a demo by Ben Kweller
- "Freak the Freak Out", an episode of American TV series Victorious
  - "Freak the Freak Out", a song by the cast of Victorious, featuring Victoria Justice
