= Freek (given name) =

Freek is a masculine given name. It is a Dutch-language diminutive of Frederik.

== People ==
It may refer to:

- Freek Bezuidenhout (1773-1815) Boer rebel of Cape Colony
- Freek de Jonge (born 1944) Dutch artist
- Freek Golinski (born 1991) Belgium badminton player
- Freek Heerkens (born 1989) Dutch soccer player
- Freek Rikkerink known by the mononym Freek, Dutch singer and part of the Dutch musical duo Suzan & Freek
- Freek Thoone (born 1985) Dutch soccer player
- Freek van de Graaff (1944-2009) Dutch rower
- Freek van der Wart (born 1988) Dutch short track speed skater
- Freek Vonk (born 1983) Dutch biologist
- Freek Vos (born 1997) Dutch basketball player

== See also ==
- Freak (disambiguation)
- Fred (given name), the equivalent English-language diminutive of Frederic
