= Freq =

Freq may refer to:

- Frequency (abbreviation)
- Neuronal calcium sensor-1, protein also known as frequenin homolog or freq

== Arts and entertainment ==
- Freq (album), 1985 album by English singer and musician Robert Calvert
- Frequency (video game), a music video game
- Freq Nasty, real name Darin McFayden, an American DJ and music producer
- CJMB-FM, a Peterborough, Ontario radio station branded as "Freq 90.5"
- WFXS (FM), a Centre County, Pennsylvania radio station formerly branded as "The Freq" under call sign WFEQ

== See also ==
- Freek (disambiguation)
- Freak (disambiguation)
- Phreak
- Phreek
