= Freak Out! (magazine) =

Freak Out! was a Peruvian magazine, mostly oriented towards the music scene. The first issue dated 2004 and the final 16th issue dated April 2009. The magazine was distributed in the cities of Lima, Arequipa, Cuzco and Trujillo.
