= Freaked Out (song) =

2026 single by Fat Papi and prodshushy

Single by Fat Papi and prodshushy
- Released: 4 June 2026
- Length: 2:38
- Label: Broke
- Songwriter: Baban Hussain
- Producer: prodshushy

Fat Papi singles chronology
| "Flex" (2026) | "Freaked Out" (2026) | "Do You Want Me" (2026) |

prodshushy singles chronology
| "No One Else" (2026) | "Freaked Out" (2026) | "Do You Want Me" (2026) |

Music video
- "Freaked Out" on YouTube

"Freaked Out" is a song by New Zealand rapper Fat Papi and record producer prodshushy. It was released on 4 June 2026.

== Composition ==
The song features a club-leaning hip-hop instrumental. Through confident delivery, Fat Papi describes a woman that he finds attractive.

== Critical reception ==
TrendyHipHop praised the song for its concise structure, noting Fat Papi's "loose and confident" delivery, while stating that the production "gives the record a textural depth that purely solo efforts sometimes miss." They also highlighted the contrast between the song's "repeated love motif" and its subsequent shift to a more energetic style, writing that it made the track "memorable on first listen rather than just familiar."

== Music video ==
An official music video was directed by The Glovebox and shot by Xav Compton.

== TikTok virality ==
Upon its release, the song gained widespread popularity on TikTok due to its use in a video by Latvian-British social media influencer Jocelyn Meiere about her bob cut, which started a viral trend.

== Track listing ==
- Streaming/digital download
1. "Freaked Out" – 2:38
2. "Freaked Out" (After Hours Slowed) – 3:00
3. "Freaked Out" (After Hours Sped Up) – 2:21

== Charts ==
Chart performance
| Chart (2026) | Peak position |
|---|---|
| Australia (ARIA) | 42 |
| Austria (Ö3 Austria Top 40) | 11 |
| Canada (Canadian Hot 100) | 28 |
| Czech Republic Singles Digital (ČNS IFPI) | 34 |
| Germany (GfK) | 17 |
| Greece International (IFPI) | 11 |
| Hungary (Single Top 40) | 35 |
| India International (IMI) | 1 |
| Ireland (IRMA) | 82 |
| Latvia Streaming (LaIPA) | 10 |
| Lithuania (AGATA) | 14 |
| Middle East and North Africa (IFPI) | 14 |
| New Zealand (Recorded Music NZ) | 38 |
| Poland Streaming (OLiS) | 31 |
| Romania (Billboard) | 7 |
| Russia Streaming (TopHit) | 23 |
| Saudi Arabia (IFPI) | 18 |
| Slovakia Singles Digital (ČNS IFPI) | 25 |
| Sweden Heatseeker (Sverigetopplistan) | 16 |
| Switzerland (Schweizer Hitparade) | 20 |
| Turkey International Airplay (Radiomonitor Türkiye) | 5 |
| United Arab Emirates (IFPI) | 6 |
| UK Singles (Official Charts) | 42 |
| US Billboard Hot 100 | 88 |
| US Hot R&B/Hip-Hop Songs (Billboard) | 23 |
