= Dean Corll =

American serial killer (1939–1973)

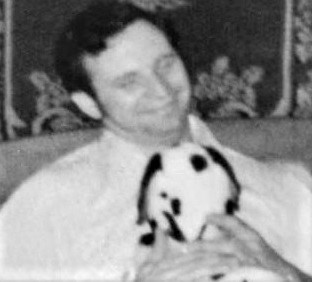
- Corll in 1973
- Born: Dean Arnold Corll; December 24, 1939; Fort Wayne, Indiana, U.S.
- Died: August 8, 1973 (aged 33); Pasadena, Texas, U.S.
- Cause of death: Exsanguination from gunshot wounds to the chest, back, and lungs
- Other names: The Candy Man; The Pied Piper
- Motive: Sexual gratification; sexual sadism; possession; control
- Conviction: Unattributable due to death
- Accomplices: David Owen Brooks; Elmer Wayne Henley

Details
- Victims: 29+
- Span of crimes: 1970–1973
- Country: United States
- State: Texas

Dean Arnold Corll (December 24, 1939 – August 8, 1973) was an American serial killer and sex offender who abducted, raped, tortured and murdered at least 29 teenage boys and young men between 1970 and 1973 in Houston and Pasadena, Texas. He was aided by two teenaged accomplices, David Owen Brooks and Elmer Wayne Henley. The crimes, which became known as the Houston Mass Murders, came to light after Henley fatally shot Corll. Upon discovery, the case was considered the worst example of serial murder in United States history.

Corll's victims were typically lured with an offer of a party or a lift to one of the various addresses at which he resided between 1970 and 1973. They would then be restrained either by force or deception, and each was killed either by strangulation or shooting with a .22 caliber pistol. Corll and his accomplices buried eighteen of their victims in a rented boat shed; four other victims were buried in woodland near Lake Sam Rayburn, one victim was buried on a beach in Jefferson County, and at least six victims were buried on a beach on the Bolivar Peninsula. Brooks and Henley confessed to assisting Corll in several abductions and murders; both were sentenced to life imprisonment.

Corll was also known as the Candy Man and the Pied Piper, because he and his family had previously owned and operated a candy factory in Houston Heights, and he had been known to give free candy to local children.

== Early life ==
=== Childhood ===
Dean Arnold Corll was born on December 24, 1939, in Fort Wayne, Indiana, the first child of Mary Emma Robison (1916–2010) and Arnold Edwin Corll (1916–2001). Corll's father was strict with his children, whereas his mother was markedly protective of both her sons. Their marriage was marred by frequent quarreling and the couple divorced in 1946, four years after the birth of their younger son, Stanley Wayne. Mary subsequently sold the family home and relocated to a trailer home in Memphis, Tennessee, where Arnold had been drafted into the United States Air Force after their divorce, to allow her sons to remain in contact with their father.

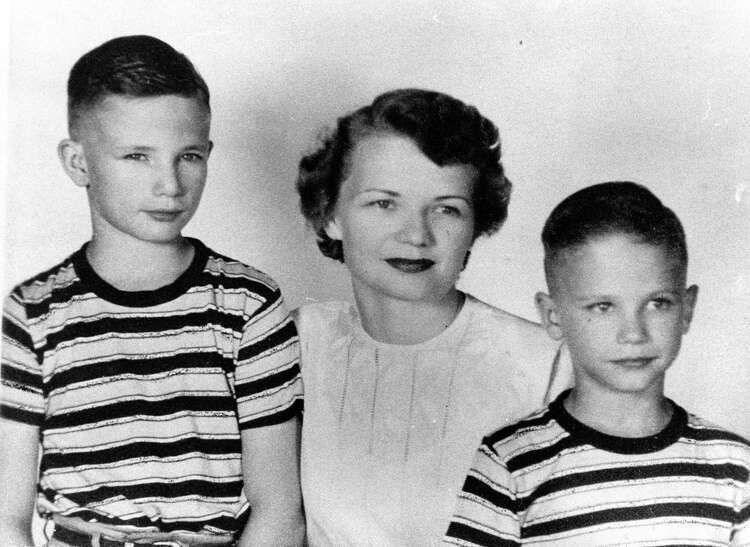
Corll (left), pictured with his mother and brother in June 1950

Corll was a shy, serious child who rarely socialized with other children, but at the same time displayed concern for the wellbeing of others. He was also markedly sensitive to any form of criticism or rejection. At the age of seven, he suffered an undiagnosed case of rheumatic fever, which was not recognized until doctors found Corll had a heart murmur in 1950. As a result of this diagnosis, Corll was told to avoid physical education classes in school.

Corll's parents attempted reconciliation and remarried in 1950, subsequently moving to Pasadena, Texas, a suburb of Houston; however, the reconciliation was short lived and, in 1953, the couple once again divorced, with the mother again retaining custody of her two sons and briefly residing in a trailer home upon a rural farm while supporting her children via menial employment. The divorce was granted on amicable grounds and both boys maintained regular contact with their father.

Following the second divorce, Corll's mother married a traveling clock salesman named Jake John West. The family moved to the small town of Vidor, Texas, where Corll's half-sister, Joyce Jeanine (1955–2016), was born. Corll's mother and stepfather started a small family candy company, initially operating from the garage of their home. (Note: Corll's mother would later state the inspiration for her founding a candy business was a pecan nut salesman calling at her home and observing her baking several pies. This had inspired the salesman to state to her: "If you've got that much energy, why don't you start making candy?") From the earliest days of the business, Corll worked day and night while still attending school. He and his younger brother were responsible for operating the candy-making machines and packing the product, which his stepfather sold on his sales route. This route often involved West traveling to Houston, where much of the product was sold.

From 1954 to 1958, Corll attended Vidor High School, where he was regarded as a well-behaved student who achieved satisfactory grades. As had been the case in his childhood, Corll was also considered somewhat of a loner, although he is known to have occasionally dated girls in his teenage years. In high school, Corll's only major interest was the brass band, in which he played trombone.

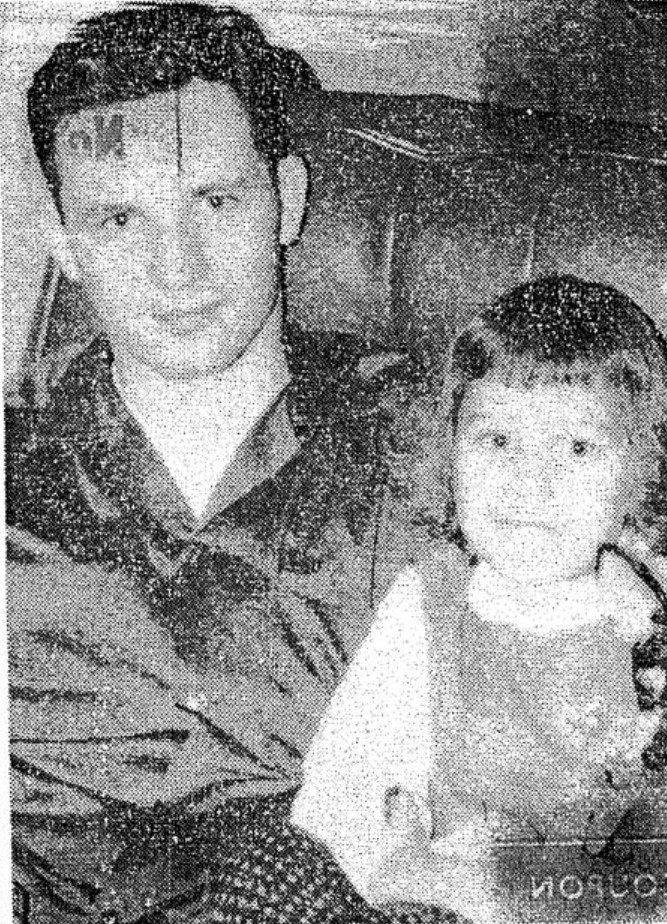
Corll, pictured with his half-sister, Joyce West, c. 1960

=== Move to Houston Heights ===
Corll graduated from Vidor High School in the summer of 1958. Shortly thereafter, he and his family moved to the northern outskirts of Houston so that the family candy business could be closer to the city where the majority of their product was sold. Corll's family opened a new shop, which they named Pecan Prince in reference to the brand name of the family product. In 1960, at the request of his mother, Corll moved to Yoder, Indiana, to live with his widowed grandmother. During this time, Corll formed a close relationship with a local girl, although he rejected a subsequent marriage proposal she made to him in 1962. Corll lived in Indiana for almost two years but returned to Houston in 1962 to help with his family's candy business, which by this date had moved to Houston Heights. He later moved into an apartment of his own above the shop.

Corll's mother divorced West in 1963 and opened a new candy business, which she named Corll Candy Company; Dean was appointed vice president of the new family firm, with his younger brother Stanley being appointed secretary-treasurer. The same year, one of the teenaged male employees of Corll Candy Company complained to Corll's mother that her son had made sexual advances towards him. In response, she fired the teenager.

=== U.S. Army service ===
Corll was drafted into the United States Army on August 10, 1964, and assigned to Fort Polk, Louisiana, for basic training. He was later assigned to Fort Benning, Georgia, to train as a radio repairman before his permanent assignment to Fort Hood, Texas. According to official military records, Corll's period of service in the army was unblemished. Corll, however, reportedly hated military service; he applied for a hardship discharge on the grounds that he was needed in his family's business. The army granted his request and he was given an honorable discharge on June 11, 1965, after ten months of service.

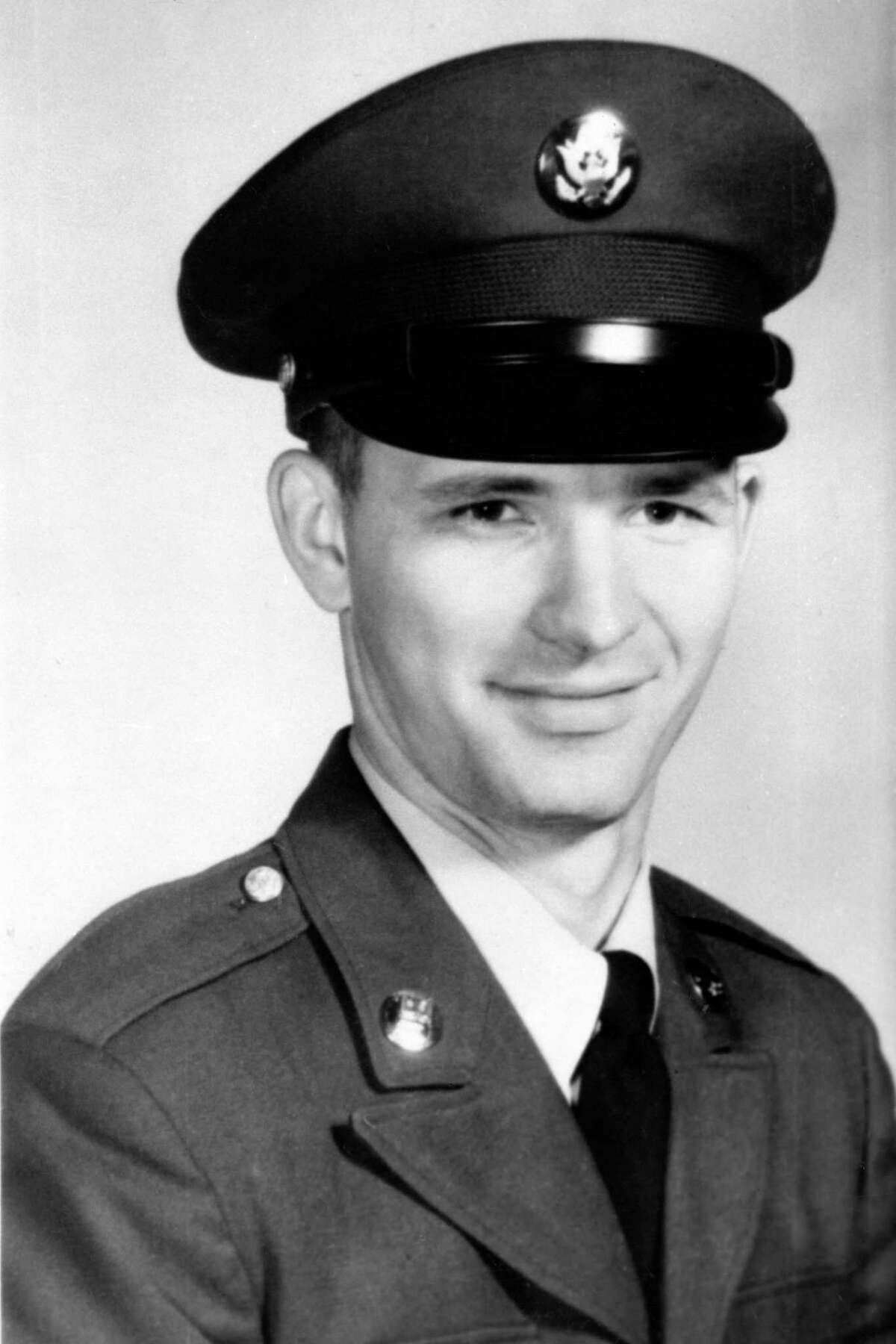
Corll, aged 24, shortly after entering the US Army in August 1964

Reportedly, Corll divulged to some of his close acquaintances after his release from the army that it was during his military service that he had first realized that he was homosexual and had experienced his first homosexual encounters. Other acquaintances noted subtle changes in Corll's mannerisms when in the company of teenage males after he had completed his service and returned to Houston, which led them to believe he may have been homosexual.

== Corll Candy Company ==
Following his honorable discharge from the army, Corll returned to Houston Heights and resumed the position he had held as vice-president of Corll Candy Company. Corll's former stepfather had retained ownership of the family's former candy business, Pecan Prince, following his divorce from Corll's mother in 1963; competition between the two firms was fierce. As had been the case in his teenage years, Corll increased the number of hours he devoted to the candy business to satisfy an increasing public demand for his family's product.

In 1965, Corll Candy Company relocated to a bungalow on West 22nd Street, directly across the street from Helms Elementary School. (Note: According to some sources, the Corll Candy Company had either rebranded to Corll's Candy Kitchen or became colloquially known by this name either by the time the firm relocated directly across from Helms Elementary School or shortly thereafter.) Corll was known to give free candy to local children, in particular teenage boys. As a result of this behavior, he earned himself the nicknames of the "Candy Man" and the "Pied Piper." The company employed a small workforce, and he was seen to behave flirtatiously toward several teenage male employees. Corll is also known to have installed a pool table at the rear of the candy factory where employees and local youths would congregate—typically in the evening—to listen to music and play pool or penny ante.

=== Relationship with David Brooks ===
In 1967, Corll befriended 12-year-old David Owen Brooks, then a sixth grade student and one of the many children to whom he gave free candy. Brooks initially became one of Corll's many youthful companions, regularly socializing with Corll and various teenage boys who congregated at the rear of the candy factory. He also joined Corll on the regular trips he took to South Texas beaches in the company of various youths, and later commented that Corll was the first adult male who did not mock his appearance. Whenever Brooks told Corll he needed cash, Corll gave him money, and the youth began to view Corll as a father figure. Upon Corll's urging, a sexual relationship gradually developed between the two. Beginning in 1969, Corll alternately paid Brooks up to $10 or purchased gifts for the teenager to allow him to perform fellatio on the youth.

Brooks's parents were divorced; his father lived in Houston and his mother had relocated to Beaumont, a city 85 miles (140 km) east of Houston. In 1970, when he was 15, Brooks dropped out of Waltrip High School and moved to Beaumont to live with his mother. Whenever he visited his father in Houston, he also visited Corll, who allowed him to stay at his apartment if he wished. Later the same year, Brooks moved back to Houston. By his own later admission, Brooks began regarding Corll's apartment as his second home.

By the time Brooks dropped out of high school, Corll's mother, brother and half-sister had relocated to Manitou Springs, Colorado, after the failure of her third marriage and the closure of Corll Candy Company in June 1968. Corll's mother opened a new candy firm in Colorado, although Corll remained in Houston. Although she often talked to her eldest son on the telephone, his mother never saw him again.

Shortly before the closure of the candy company, Corll took a job as an electrician at the Houston Lighting and Power Company (HL&P) while simultaneously working for the family firm. In this employment, he tested electrical relay systems, and later rose to the rank of supervisor. Corll worked in this employment until the day of his death.

== Murders ==
Between 1970 and 1973, Corll is known to have killed a minimum of twenty-nine victims. All of his victims were males aged 13 to 20, the majority of whom were in their mid-teens. Most victims were abducted from Houston Heights, which was then a low-income neighborhood northwest of downtown Houston. In most of these abductions, he was assisted by one or both of his teenage accomplices: David Owen Brooks and Elmer Wayne Henley. Several victims were friends of one or both of Corll's accomplices; others were either hitchhikers or individuals with whom Corll had himself become acquainted prior to their abduction and murder, and two other victims, Billy Gene Baulch Jr. and Gregory Malley Winkle, were former employees of Corll Candy Company.

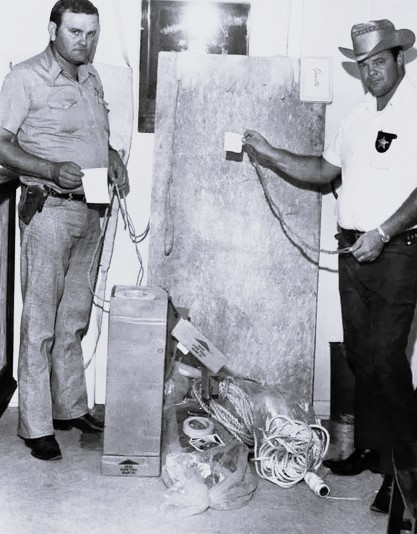
One of two marine-grade plywood torture boards constructed by Corll

Corll's victims were usually lured into either one of the two vehicles he owned (a Ford Econoline van and a Plymouth GTX) or a 1969 Chevrolet Corvette he is known to have purchased for Brooks in February 1971. The enticement was typically an offer of a party or a lift, and the victim would be driven to Corll's house. At Corll's residence, the youths would be plied with alcohol or other drugs until they passed out, tricked into donning handcuffs, or simply grabbed by force. They were then stripped naked and tied to either Corll's bed or, usually, a marine-grade plywood torture board which was regularly hung on a wall. Once manacled, the victims would be sexually assaulted, beaten, tortured and, sometimes after several days, killed by strangulation or shooting with a .22 caliber pistol. Their bodies were then tied in plastic sheeting and buried in one of four places: a rented boat shed in Southwest Houston, a beach on the Bolivar Peninsula, a woodland near Lake Sam Rayburn (where Corll's family owned a lakeside log cabin), or a beach in Jefferson County.

In several instances, Corll forced his victims to either phone or write to their parents with explanations for their absences in an effort to allay the parents' fears for their sons' safety. He is also known to have retained keepsakes—usually keys—from his victims. (Note: Henley would later state to investigators that one of Corll's motivations for retaining the keys of his victims had been to subsequently burglarize their homes. Although some of Corll's victims' homes were later burglarized, Henley was adamant he had never actually participated in these burglaries himself.)

During the years in which he abducted and murdered his victims, Corll often changed addresses—sometimes living in an apartment for a matter of weeks before relocating. However, until he moved into his father's former home in Pasadena in the spring of 1973, he always lived in or close to Houston Heights—often near elementary schools.

=== First known murders ===
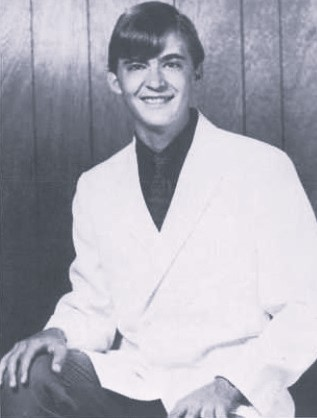
Jeffrey Alan Konen

Corll killed his first known victim, an 18-year-old college freshman named Jeffrey Konen, on September 25, 1970. Konen vanished while hitchhiking with another student from the University of Texas to his parents' home in Houston. He and his hitchhiking companion were picked up by a fellow student near Bergstrom Air Force Base at 3:30 p.m.; he was dropped off alone at the corner of Westheimer Road and South Voss Road near the Uptown area of Houston at approximately 6:30 p.m. Corll likely offered Konen a lift to his home, which Konen evidently accepted. At the time of Konen's disappearance, Corll lived in the Harold Turboff apartments, where he had paid a deposit of a month's rent on September 21.

Brooks led police to Konen's body on August 10, 1973. The body was buried at High Island Beach. Forensic scientists subsequently deduced that Konen had died of asphyxiation caused by manual strangulation and a cloth gag that had been placed in his mouth. The nude body was found buried beneath a section of broken cement, covered with a layer of lime, wrapped in plastic, and bound hand and foot with nylon cord, suggesting he had been violated.

Shortly after Konen's murder, Brooks interrupted Corll in the act of sexually assaulting two teenage boys whom Corll had strapped to a four-poster bed. Corll promised Brooks a car in return for his silence; Brooks accepted the offer and Corll later bought him a green Chevrolet Corvette. Corll later told Brooks that he had killed the two youths, and offered him $200 (the equivalent of approximately $1,670 as of 2026) for any boy he could lure to Corll's apartment.

On December 13, 1970, Brooks lured two 14-year-old Spring Branch youths named James Glass and Danny Yates away from a religious rally held in Houston Heights to an apartment Corll had recently rented at 3300 Yorktown. Glass was an acquaintance of Brooks who, at Brooks's behest, had previously visited Corll's address. Both youths were restrained to Corll's four-poster bed with rope and handcuffs and subsequently raped, strangled, and buried in a boat shed he had rented on November 17. An electrical cord with alligator clips attached to each end was buried alongside Yates's body.

Six weeks after the double murder of Glass and Yates, on January 30, 1971, Brooks and Corll encountered two teenage brothers, Donald and Jerry Waldrop, walking toward their parents' home. The Waldrop brothers had been driven to a friend's home by their father with plans to discuss forming a bowling league and had begun walking home after learning their friend was not at home. Both boys were enticed into Corll's van and driven to an apartment Corll had rented on Mangum Road, where they were raped, strangled and subsequently buried in the boat shed.

Between March and May 1971, Corll abducted and killed three victims, all of whom lived in Houston Heights and all of whom were buried toward the rear of the boat shed. In each of these abductions, Brooks is known to have been a participant. One of these three victims, 15-year-old Randell Harvey, was last seen by his family on the afternoon of March 9 cycling towards Oak Forest, where he worked part-time as a gas station attendant. Harvey was driven to Corll's Mangum Road apartment, where he was subsequently killed by a single gunshot to the head. The other two victims, 13-year-old David Hilligiest and 16-year-old Gregory Malley Winkle, were abducted and killed together on the afternoon of May 29; both were murdered at an apartment Corll rented on West 11th Street.

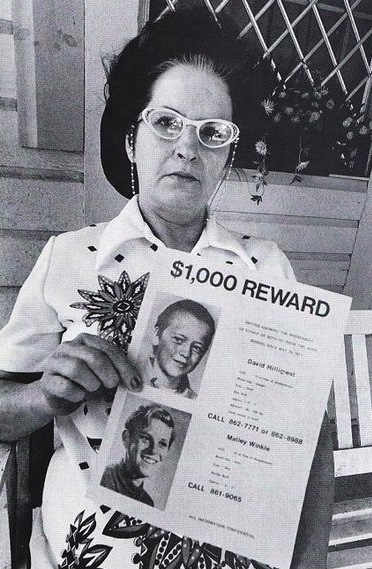
Selma Winkle, pictured holding a reward poster she and the parents of David Hilligiest distributed following the disappearance of their sons

As had been the case with parents of other victims of Corll, both sets of parents launched a frantic search for their sons. One of the youths who voluntarily offered to distribute posters the parents had printed offering a monetary reward for information leading to the boys' whereabouts was 15-year-old Elmer Wayne Henley—a lifelong friend of Hilligiest. The youth pinned the reward posters around the Heights and attempted to reassure Hilligiest's parents that there might be an innocent explanation for the boys' absence.

On July 1, 1971, a 17-year-old, Donald Falcon, disappeared from the streets near his parents' West University Place apartment complex. Sections of his body were later recovered from the boat shed. (Note: Four separate arm bones recovered from Corll's boat shed would be identified via DNA analysis as belonging to Falcon in 2014. As only four appendage bones were recovered, investigators decided insufficient evidence existed to officially declare Falcon a murder victim.) Seven weeks later, on August 17, Corll and Brooks encountered a 17-year-old acquaintance of Brooks, Ruben Watson Haney, walking home from a movie theater in Houston. Brooks persuaded Haney to attend a party at an address Corll had moved to on San Felipe Street the previous month. Haney agreed and was taken to Corll's home where he was subsequently strangled and buried in the boat shed.

In September 1971, Corll moved to an apartment on Columbia Street. This address was also located in the Heights. Brooks later stated he had assisted Corll in the abduction and murder of two youths during the time Corll lived at this address, including one youth who was killed "just before Wayne Henley came into the picture." In his confession, Brooks stated the youth killed immediately prior to Henley's involvement in the murders was abducted from the Heights and kept alive for approximately four days before his murder. The identities of both of these victims remain unknown.

=== Participation of Elmer Wayne Henley ===
In approximately October 1971, Brooks encountered Wayne Henley as the two truanted from Hamilton Junior High School; he later introduced him to Corll. Henley likely was lured to Corll's address as an intended victim. However, Corll evidently decided the youth would make a good accomplice and later offered him the same fee of $200 for any boy he could lure to his apartment, informing Henley that he was involved in a "white slavery ring" operating from Dallas.

Henley later stated that, for several months, he ignored Corll's offer, although he did maintain an acquaintance with Corll and gradually began to view him as something of a "brother-type person" whose work ethic he admired and in whom he could confide. In early 1972, he decided to accept Corll's offer because he and his family were in dire financial circumstances. Henley said the first abduction he participated in occurred during the time Corll resided at 925 Schuler Street, an address Corll had moved to on February 19. (Brooks later claimed that Henley became involved in the abductions while Corll resided at the address he had occupied immediately prior to Schuler Street.) If Henley's statement is to be believed, the victim was abducted from the Heights in February or early March 1972. In the statement Henley gave to police following his arrest, the youth stated he and Corll picked up "a boy" at the corner of 11th and Studewood, and lured him to Corll's home on the promise of smoking some marijuana with the pair. At Corll's home—using a ruse he and Corll had prepared—Henley cuffed his own hands behind his back, freed himself with a key hidden in his back pocket, then duped the youth into donning the handcuffs before observing Corll bind and gag him. Henley then left the youth alone with Corll, believing he was to be sold into the slavery ring as a houseboy. The identity of this first victim Henley assisted in the abduction of remains unknown.

One month later, on March 24, 1972, Henley, Brooks, and Corll encountered an 18-year-old acquaintance of Henley's, Frank Aguirre, leaving a restaurant on Yale Street, where the youth worked. Henley called Aguirre over to Corll's van and invited him to drink beer and smoke marijuana with the trio at Corll's apartment. Aguirre agreed and followed the trio to Corll's home in his Rambler. Inside Corll's house, Aguirre smoked marijuana with the trio before picking up a pair of handcuffs Corll had left on his table. In response, Corll pounced on Aguirre, pushed him onto the table, and cuffed his hands behind his back.

Henley later claimed that he had not known of Corll's true intentions towards Aguirre when he had persuaded his friend to accompany him to Corll's home. In a 2010 interview, he claimed to have attempted to persuade Corll not to assault and kill Aguirre once Corll and Brooks had bound and gagged the youth. However, Corll refused, informing Henley that he had raped, tortured, and killed the previous victim he had assisted in abducting, and that he intended to do the same with Aguirre. Henley subsequently assisted Corll and Brooks in Aguirre's burial at High Island Beach.

Despite the revelations that Corll was, in reality, killing the boys that he and Brooks had assisted in abducting, Henley became an active participant in the abductions and murders. One month later, on April 20, he assisted Corll and Brooks in the abduction of another youth, 17-year-old Mark Scott. Scott—who was well known to Corll, Henley and Brooks—was specifically chosen by Corll to be his next victim as, according to Henley, he had recently "cheated [Corll] on a deal" relating to stolen property. He was grabbed and fought furiously against attempts by Corll to restrain him, even attempting to stab Corll with a knife after several hours of abuse and torture including burning with incense cones. However, Scott saw Henley pointing a pistol toward him and according to Brooks, Scott "just gave up." All three then alternately shot Scott with a pellet gun before Corll again raped him. Scott ultimately suffered the same fate as Aguirre: rape, torture, strangulation, and burial at High Island Beach. (Note: Henley would later recount that as he strangled Scott, the teen had repeatedly made tapping gestures to his skull with the extended index finger and thumb of his right hand in the symbol of a gun as a plea to be shot as opposed to strangled.)

Brooks later stated Henley was "especially sadistic" in his participation in the murders committed at Schuler Street and Henley later admitted to gradually becoming "fascinated" with "how much stamina people have" when subjected to the act of murder, adding that, as a coping mechanism, he occasionally "tried to dehumanize" the victims. Before Corll vacated the address on June 26, Henley assisted Corll and Brooks in the abduction and murder of two youths named Billy Baulch and Johnny Delome. According to Henley, on this occasion, he was invited to Corll's apartment where he observed the two socializing with Corll and Brooks; he then assisted in subduing the pair. In Brooks's confession, he stated that both youths were tied to Corll's bed and, after their torture and rape, Henley manually strangled Baulch, with the process lasting almost thirty minutes. Henley then shouted, "Hey, Johnny!" and shot Delome in the forehead, with the bullet exiting through the youth's ear. Delome then pleaded with Henley, "Wayne, please don't!" before he was strangled. Both youths were buried at High Island Beach.

During the time Corll resided at Schuler Street, the trio lured a 19-year-old named William Ridinger to the house. Ridinger was initially tied to hooks drilled upon the wall of the property and, later, the plywood board, where he was tortured and abused by Corll over the course of approximately three days. Brooks later claimed he persuaded Corll to allow Ridinger to be released, and the youth was allowed to leave the residence. On another occasion during the time Corll resided at Schuler Street, Henley knocked Brooks unconscious as he entered the house. Corll then tied Brooks to the plywood board and assaulted the youth repeatedly before releasing him. Despite the assault, Brooks continued to assist Corll in the abductions of the victims.

After vacating the Schuler Street residence, Corll moved to an apartment at Westcott Towers, where, in the summer of 1972, he is known to have killed a further two victims. The first of these victims, 17-year-old Steven Sickman, was last seen leaving a party held near to the Heights shortly before midnight on July 19. The youth was savagely bludgeoned about the chest with a blunt instrument before he was strangled and buried in the boat shed. Approximately one month later, on or about August 21, 19-year-old Roy Bunton was abducted while walking to his job as an assistant manager in a Northwest Mall shoe store. Bunton's eyes and face were bound with adhesive tape and his mouth gagged with a section of towel. He was shot twice in the head and buried in the boat shed. Neither youth was named by either Brooks or Henley as being a victim of Corll, and both youths were identified as victims only in 2011.

On October 3, 1972, Henley and Brooks encountered two Heights teenagers, Wally Jay Simoneaux and Richard Hembree, walking to Hembree's home. Simoneaux and Hembree were enticed into Brooks's Corvette and driven to Corll's Westcott Towers apartment. That evening, Simoneaux is known to have phoned his mother's home and to have shouted the word "Mama" into the receiver before the connection was terminated. The following morning, Hembree was accidentally shot in the mouth by Henley, with the bullet exiting through his neck. Several hours later, both youths were strangled to death and subsequently buried in a common grave inside the boat shed directly above the bodies of James Glass and Danny Yates. Sometime in November 1972, 18-year-old Willard Branch, an Oak Forest youth known to both Corll and Henley, disappeared while hitchhiking from Mount Pleasant to Houston. (Note: Some accounts state Branch was abducted in February 1972. However, the Office of the Medical Examiner of Harris County lists Branch's death as having occurred in November 1972.) His gagged and emasculated body was buried in the boat shed. On November 11, a 19-year-old Spring Branch youth named Richard Kepner disappeared on his way to a phone booth. Kepner was strangled and buried at High Island Beach. Altogether, at least ten teenagers between the ages of 13 and 19 were murdered between March and November 1972, five of whom were buried at High Island Beach, and five inside the boat shed.

On January 20, 1973, Corll moved to an address on Wirt Road in the Spring Branch district of Houston. Within two weeks of moving into this address, he had killed 17-year-old Joseph Lyles. Lyles was known to both Corll and Brooks. He had lived on Antoine Drive—the same street upon which Brooks resided in early 1973—and is known to have visited Corll's apartment to purchase marijuana on at least one occasion prior to his disappearance. On March 1, Corll vacated his Wirt Road apartment; he briefly resided in an apartment on South Post Oak Road before moving to 2020 Lamar Drive, an address in Pasadena his father was in the process of vacating after residing in the property for twenty-two years. He briefly lived with his father, stepmother and half-brother Michael Wayland (b. 1957) at this address before they vacated the property. (Note: 2020 Lamar Drive was demolished in February 2023.)

=== 2020 Lamar Drive ===
No known victims were killed between February 3 and June 4, 1973. Corll is known to have suffered from a hydrocele in early 1973, which may have contributed to this period of inactivity. In addition, around the time of Lyles's murder, Henley spontaneously traveled to Florida with a long-haul truck driver uncle before temporarily relocating to Mount Pleasant in an apparent effort to distance himself from Corll. (Note: Henley returned to live with his mother in April 1973. He would later claim to have made this decision in response to a phone call from David Brooks likely made at Corll's behest in which Brooks stated he could not guarantee the safety of one of his younger brothers or the younger brother of David Hilligiest if he did not return home.) These facts may account for this sudden lull in killings.

Nonetheless, from June, Corll's rate of killings increased dramatically, and both Henley and Brooks later testified to the increase in the level of brutality of the murders committed while Corll resided at Lamar Drive. Henley later compared Corll's escalation to being "like a blood lust", adding that he and Brooks would instinctively know when Corll was to announce that he "needed to do a new boy," due to the fact that he would appear restless, smoking cigarettes and making reflex movements.

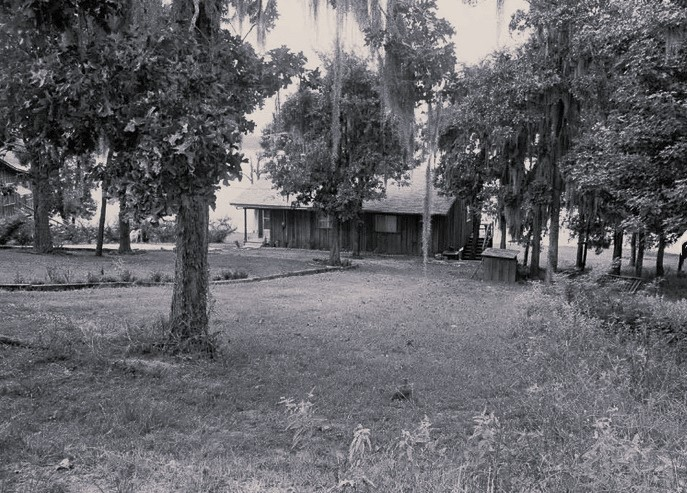
The Corll family lakeside log cabin at Lake Sam Rayburn. Four victims killed by Corll and his accomplices in 1973 were buried in woodland at this location.

On June 4, Corll and Henley abducted 15-year-old William Ray Lawrence; the youth was last seen alive by his father on 31st Street. After three days of abuse and torture, Lawrence was strangled before being buried at Lake Sam Rayburn. (Note: In recollecting Lawrence's abuse and murder to forensic psychologist Katherine Ramsland, Henley would state: "That [particular abduction and murder] was hard. I was trying to shoot myself up full of drugs while Dean had Billy tied up ... I recall thinking 'You don't even know what this drug will do to you,' and the answer was 'I don't care.' All the things people refer to as torture [in this case], that was all Dean getting me to do this stuff: 'Try this; try that.'") Less than two weeks later, 20-year-old Raymond Stanley Blackburn was abducted, strangled, and buried at Lake Sam Rayburn. On July 6, 1973, Henley began attending classes at the Coaches Driving School in Bellaire, where he became acquainted with 15-year-old Homer Louis Garcia. The following day, Garcia telephoned his mother to say he was spending the night with a friend; he was shot and left to bleed to death in Corll's bathtub before he was buried at Lake Sam Rayburn. Five days later, on July 12, 17-year-old John Sellars of Orange County was bound, shot to death and buried at High Island Beach.

In July 1973, after Brooks married his pregnant fiancée, Henley temporarily became Corll's sole procurer of victims, assisting in the abduction and murder of three Heights youths between July 19 and 25. Henley claimed these three abductions were the only three that occurred after his becoming an accomplice to Corll in which Brooks was not a participant. One of these three victims, 15-year-old Michael Baulch, brother of previous victim Billy Baulch, was last seen by his family on July 19 on his way to get a haircut; he was strangled and buried at Lake Sam Rayburn. The other two victims, Charles Cobble and Marty Ray Jones, were abducted together on the afternoon of July 25. Henley himself later buried both youths' bodies in the boat shed.

On August 3, 1973, Corll killed his last victim, a 13-year-old boy from South Houston named James Stanton Dreymala. Dreymala was abducted by Corll while riding his bike in Pasadena and driven to Lamar Drive upon the pretense of collecting empty glass bottles to resell. At Corll's home, Dreymala called his parents to tell them he was at "a party" across town before he was tied to Corll's torture board, raped, tortured, and strangled with a cord before being buried in the boat shed. Brooks later described Dreymala as a "small, blond boy" for whom he had bought a pizza and in whose company he had spent forty-five minutes at Corll's home before the youth was attacked.

== August 8, 1973 ==
On the evening of August 7, 1973, Henley invited 20-year-old Timothy Cordell Kerley to attend a party at Corll's Pasadena residence. Kerley—a casual acquaintance of Corll who was intended to be his next victim—accepted the offer. Brooks was not present at the time. The two youths arrived at Corll's house, where they sniffed paint fumes and drank alcohol until midnight before leaving the house, promising to return shortly. Henley and Kerley then drove back to Houston Heights and Kerley parked his vehicle close to Henley's home. The two exited the vehicle and Henley, hearing commotion across the street emanating from the home of his 15-year-old friend Rhonda Louise Williams, walked toward her home. Williams—nursing a sprained ankle—had been beaten by her drunken father that evening and, having resolved to run away from home, had packed several basic belongings into an overnight bag before seeking temporary refuge in a washateria close to her home, where Henley encountered her. Williams accepted Henley's invitation to join him and Kerley at Corll's home and climbed into the back seat of Kerley's Volkswagen. The trio then drove toward Corll's Pasadena residence. (Note: In a 2011 interview granted to Texas Monthly magazine, Henley would reject suggestions he had intended for Kerley to become a victim of Corll, insisting that his intentions on the evening of August 7 had been for the trio to simply drink alcohol and smoke marijuana.)

At approximately 3:00 a.m. on the morning of August 8, Henley and Kerley, accompanied by Williams, returned to Corll's residence. Corll was furious that Henley had brought a girl to his house, telling him in private that he had "ruined everything". Henley explained that Williams had argued with her father that evening, and did not wish to return home. Corll appeared to calm down and offered the trio beer and marijuana. The three then began drinking and smoking marijuana, with Henley and Kerley also sniffing paint fumes as Corll watched them intently before seemingly retiring to bed. After approximately two hours, Henley, Kerley, and Williams each passed out.

=== Final confrontation ===
Henley awoke to find himself lying on his stomach and Corll snapping handcuffs onto his wrists. His mouth had been taped shut and his ankles had been bound together. Kerley and Williams lay beside Henley, securely bound with nylon rope, gagged with adhesive tape, and lying face down on the floor. Kerley had been stripped naked. Noting Henley had awoken, Corll removed the gag from his mouth. Henley protested in vain against Corll's actions, whereupon Corll reiterated that he was angry with Henley for bringing a girl to his house and that he intended to kill all three after he had assaulted and tortured Kerley, initially saying, "Man, you blew it bringing that girl," before shouting: "I'm gonna kill you all! But first I'm gonna have my fun!" He then repeatedly kicked Williams in the chest, shouting, "Wake up, bitch!"

Corll then lifted Henley to his feet and dragged him into his kitchen and placed a .22-caliber pistol against his stomach, threatening to shoot him. Henley calmed Corll, promising to participate in the torture and murder of both Williams and Kerley if Corll released him. After approximately thirty minutes of discussion, Corll agreed and untied Henley, then separately carried Kerley and Williams into his bedroom and tied them to opposite sides of his torture board: Kerley on his stomach; Williams on her back. A transistor radio was placed between Williams and Kerley and the volume turned to maximum to muffle any potential screaming. Corll also removed the adhesive tape from Kerley's mouth before informing him of his intentions to "look up" his anus as Henley again began inhaling paint fumes from a paper bag.

Corll then handed Henley an eighteen-inch hunting knife and ordered him to cut away Williams's clothes, insisting that, while he would rape and kill Kerley, Henley would do likewise to Williams. He then shouted, "What are you waiting for?" Henley began cutting away Williams's jeans and underwear as Corll placed the pistol on a bedside table, undressed and began to assault and torture Kerley. Both Kerley and Williams had awakened by this point. Kerley began writhing, pleading and shouting as Williams, whose gag Henley had removed, lifted her head and asked Henley, "Is this for real?" to which Henley answered, "Yes." Williams then asked Henley, "Are you going to do anything about it?" (Note: In 2013, Williams recounted Henley's actions on the morning of August 8, stating, "He [Henley] was afraid that he wasn't going to be able to save me. So he was going to sit down with me—you know, (just) lay down with me like he'd been doing when we talked—and he was going to put the gun by my head while we were talking ... then he was just going to shoot me.")

=== Corll's death ===
In an apparent attempt to desensitize himself to the unfolding scenario, Henley stood and paced the room as he continued to inhale paint fumes. He then asked Corll whether he might take Williams into another room. Corll ignored him and Henley then grabbed Corll's pistol, shouting, "You've gone far enough, Dean!" As Corll clambered off Kerley, Henley elaborated: "I can't go on any longer! I can't have you kill all my friends!" Corll approached Henley, saying, "Kill me, Wayne!" Henley stepped back a few paces as Corll continued to advance upon him, shouting, "You won't do it!" Henley then fired at Corll, hitting him in the forehead directly above his left eyebrow. The bullet failed to fully penetrate Corll's skull and he continued to lurch toward Henley, whereupon the youth fired another two rounds, hitting Corll in the left shoulder, with one bullet penetrating Corll's lung and lodging in his spine. Corll began coughing up blood as he ran out of the room, trapping his right foot in a loose telephone wire and hitting the wall of the hallway. Henley fired three additional bullets into his lower back and shoulder as Corll slid down the wall in the hallway outside the room where the two other teenagers were bound. Corll died where he fell, his naked body facing the wall.

Henley would recall that immediately after he shot Corll, the sole thought in his mind was that Corll would have been proud of the way he had behaved during the confrontation, adding that Corll had been training him to react quickly and forcefully and that this was exactly what he had done.

The body of Dean Corll as discovered at 2020 Lamar Drive

After Henley shot Corll, he and Kerley began weeping as Kerley repeatedly thanked him for saving his life. Henley then released Kerley and Williams from the torture board, and all three dressed and discussed what they should do. Henley suggested to Kerley and Williams that they should simply leave, although Williams initially refused—suggesting to Henley he should simply flee. Kerley then stated, "No, we should call the police." Henley agreed and looked up the number for the Pasadena Police Department (PPD) in Corll's telephone directory.

== Contacting police ==
At 8:24 a.m. on August 8, 1973, Henley telephoned the PPD. His call was answered by an operator named Velma Lines. In his call, Henley blurted to the operator, "Y'all better come here right now! I just killed a man!" Henley gave the address to the operator as 2020 Lamar Drive, Pasadena. As Kerley, Williams, and Henley waited outside Corll's home for the police to arrive, Henley mentioned to Kerley that he had "done that (killing by shooting) four or five times."

Minutes later, a PPD patrol car arrived at 2020 Lamar Drive. The three were sitting on the curb outside the house, and the officer noted the .22 caliber pistol on the driveway near the trio. Two of the three were weeping. The officer observed the younger male slumped forward and rocking back and forth with his head in his hands while weeping as the sole female—also weeping—draped one arm across his shoulder; the slightly older male simply stared blankly across the street. The younger male identified himself as Elmer Wayne Henley and told the officer that he was the individual who had made the call and indicated that Corll's body was inside the house. After confiscating the pistol and placing Henley, Williams, and Kerley inside the patrol car, the officer entered the bungalow and discovered Corll's body inside the hallway. The officer returned to the car and read Henley his Miranda rights. In response, Henley shouted: "I don't care who knows about it! I have to get it off my chest!"

Kerley later told detectives that before the first police officer arrived at Lamar Drive, Henley had informed him, "If you wasn't my friend, I could have gotten $200 for you."

=== Accomplices' confessions ===
In PPD custody, Henley was initially questioned about the killing of Corll. He recounted the events of the previous evening and that morning, explaining that he had shot Corll in self-defense. The statements given by Kerley and Williams corroborated Henley's account, and the detective questioning Henley believed he had indeed acted in self-defense.

When questioned regarding his claim that as Corll had threatened him that morning he had shouted that he had killed several boys, Henley explained that for almost three years, Brooks and he had helped procure teenage boys for Corll, who had raped and murdered them. Henley stated he had initially believed the boys he had abducted were to be sold into a Dallas-based organization for "homosexual acts, sodomy, maybe later killing," but soon learned Corll was himself killing the victims procured. Henley admitted he had assisted Corll in several abductions and murders, and that he had actively participated in the torture and mutilation of "six or eight" victims prior to their murder. Most victims had been buried in a Southwest Houston boat shed, with others buried at Lake Sam Rayburn and High Island Beach. Corll had paid up to $200 for each victim Brooks or he were able to lure to his apartment. (Note: Henley would later claim that although Corll paid him $200 for the first victim he lured to his address, Corll never paid any significant sum of money for any of the subsequent victims he procured.)

Police were initially skeptical of Henley's claims, assuming the sole homicide of the case was that of Corll, which they had ascribed as being the result of drug-fueled fisticuffs that had turned deadly. Henley was quite insistent, however, and upon his recalling the names of three boys—Cobble, Hilligiest, and Jones—whom he stated he and Brooks had procured for Corll, the police accepted that there was something to his claims, as all three teenagers were listed as missing at Houston Police Department (HPD) headquarters. Hilligiest had been reported missing in the summer of 1971; the other two boys had been missing for just two weeks. Moreover, the floor of the room where the three teenagers had been tied was covered in thick plastic sheeting. Police also found a plywood torture board measuring 8 by 3 feet (2.44 by 0.91 m) with handcuffs attached to nylon rope at two corners, and nylon ropes to the other two. Also found at Corll's address were a large hunting knife, rolls of clear plastic of the same type used to cover the floor, a portable radio rigged to a pair of dry cells to give increased volume, an electric motor with loose wires attached, eight pairs of handcuffs, a number of dildos, thin glass tubes, and lengths of rope.

Corll's Ford Econoline van parked in the driveway conveyed a similar impression. The rear windows of the van were sealed by opaque blue curtains. In the rear of the vehicle, police found a coil of rope, a swatch of beige rug covered in soil stains, and a wooden crate with air holes drilled in the sides. The pegboard walls inside the rear of the van were rigged with several rings and hooks. Another wooden crate with air holes drilled in the sides was found in Corll's backyard. Inside this crate were several strands of human hair.

He (Henley) started to take a step inside (the boat shed), but then his face just turned ashen, pale, grim ... he staggered around outside the door. Right then's when I knew there were going to be bodies in that shed.

— Houston Police officer Karl Siebeneicher describing Henley's actions upon leading police to Corll's boat shed on August 8.

== Search for victims ==
Henley agreed to accompany police to Corll's boat shed in Southwest Houston, where he claimed the bodies of several victims could be found. Inside the boat shed, police found a half-stripped stolen Chevrolet Camaro, a child's bike, a large iron drum, water containers, two sacks of lime, two shovels, a broken rake, and a large plastic bag full of teenage boys' clothing.

Two prison trusties began digging through the soft, crushed-shell earth of the boat shed and soon uncovered the body of a blond-haired teenaged boy, lying on his side, encased in clear plastic and buried beneath a layer of lime. Police continued excavating through the earth of the shed, unearthing the remains of more victims in varying stages of decomposition. Most of the bodies found were wrapped in thick, clear plastic sheeting. Some victims had been shot, others strangled, the ligatures still wrapped tightly around their necks. (Note: As the first bodies were removed from the boat shed, a visibly distressed Henley informed investigators: "It's all my fault ... because I led those boys straight to Dean.")

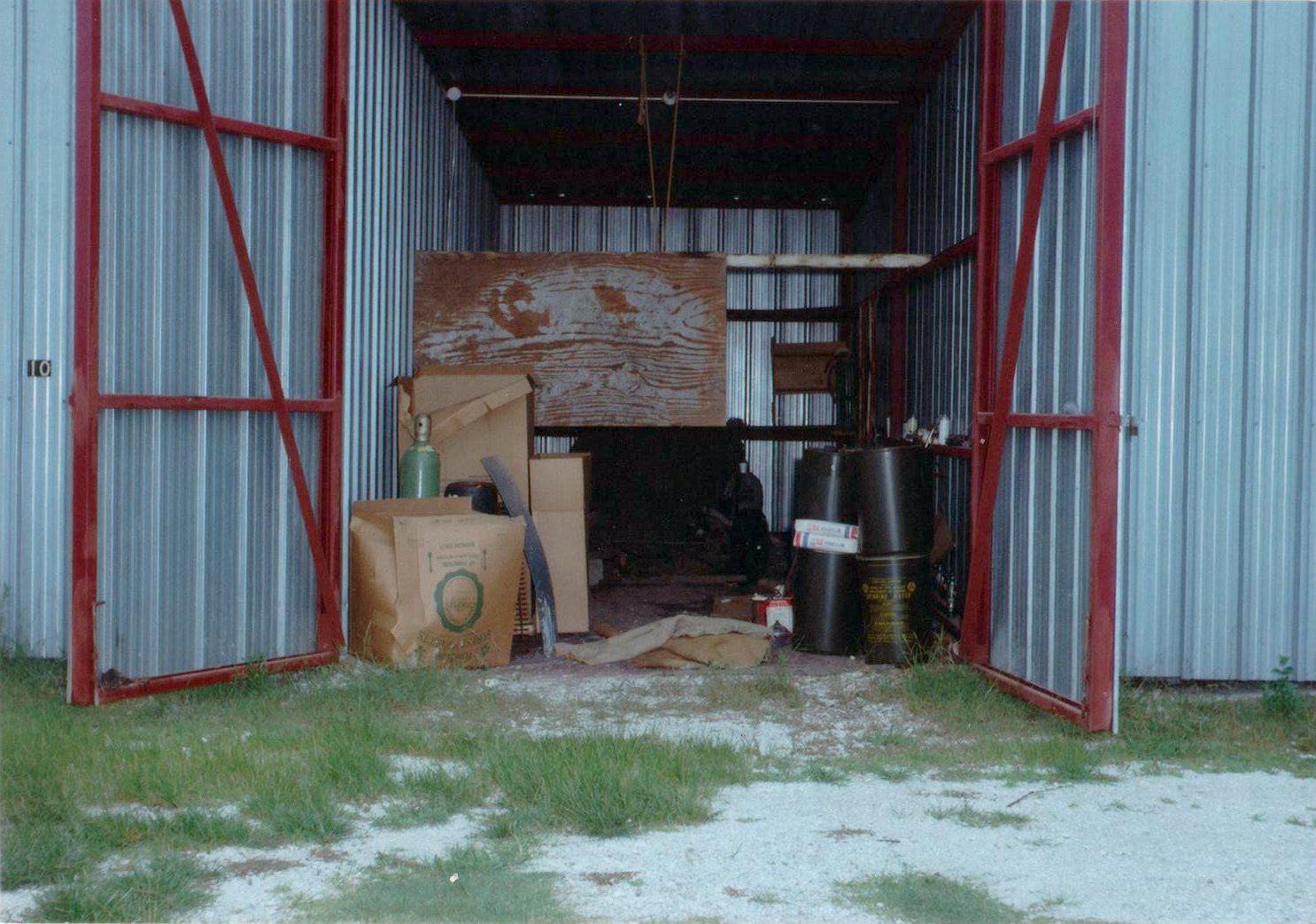
The interior of Corll's rented boat shed, pictured immediately prior to the search for victims on August 8, 1973

All of the victims found had been sodomized and most victims found bore evidence of sexual torture: pubic hairs had been plucked out, (Note: Henley would later state the plucking of victims' pubic hair was primarily a "coercion technique" used to force the victims into submission and compliance in their restraint and sexual abuse.) genitals had been chewed, objects had been inserted into their rectums, and glass rods had been inserted into their urethrae and smashed. (Note: In one section of his subsequent testimony at Henley's 1974 trial, Detective Sergeant David Mullican would state to the court: "Other means of torture were pulling their pubic hairs out one by one, shoving glass rods up the penis and shoving a large, bullet-like instrument in the victim's rectum.") Cloth rags had also been inserted into the victims' mouths and adhesive tape wound around their faces to muffle their screams. The tongue of the first victim uncovered protruded over one inch beyond the tooth margin; the mouth of the third victim unearthed on August 8 was so agape that all upper and lower teeth were visible, leading investigators to theorize the youth had died screaming. After the recovery of the eighth body from the boat shed was completed at 11:55 p.m., the search for further bodies was discontinued until the following day.

Accompanied by his father, Brooks presented himself at HPD headquarters on the evening of August 8 and gave a statement in which he denied any knowledge of or participation in the murders but admitted to having known that Corll had raped and killed two teenagers in 1970 and naming two youths—Ruben Haney and Mark Scott—whom he had seen in Corll's company immediately before their disappearances.

On the morning of August 9, Henley gave a full written statement detailing his and Brooks's involvement with Corll in the abduction and murder of numerous youths. In this confession, Henley readily admitted to having personally killed approximately nine youths and to have assisted Corll in the strangulation of others. He stated the "only three" abductions and murders Brooks had not assisted him and Corll with were committed in the summer of 1973. That afternoon, Henley accompanied police to Lake Sam Rayburn, where he, Brooks, and Corll had buried four victims killed that year. Two additional bodies were found in shallow, lime-soaked graves located close to a dirt road. Inside the lakeside log cabin owned by Corll's family, police found a second plywood torture board, rolls of plastic sheeting, shovels, and a sack of lime.

Police found nine additional bodies in the boat shed on August 9, with four separate arm bones not belonging to any victim also recovered close to the body of the twelfth victim exhumed. These bodies were recovered between 12:05 p.m. and 8:30 p.m., and all were in an advanced state of decomposition. The twelfth body unearthed bore evidence of sexual mutilation (the severed genitals of the victim were found inside a sealed plastic bag placed beside the body); another victim unearthed had several fractured ribs. The thirteenth and fourteenth bodies unearthed bore identification cards naming the victims as Donald and Jerry Waldrop.

Brooks gave a full confession on the morning of August 10, admitting to being present at several killings and assisting in several burials, although he continued to deny any direct participation in the murders. (Note: Henley would later insist Brooks had admitted to him he had killed one victim prior to his own association with Corll.) In reference to the torture board upon which Corll had restrained and tortured his victims, Brooks stated: "Once they were on the board, they were as good as dead; it was all over, but the shouting and the crying." In reference to the actual murders, Brooks stated his witnessing the victims' deaths "didn't bother [him]", adding "I saw it done many times." He agreed to accompany police to High Island Beach to assist in the search for the bodies of the victims.

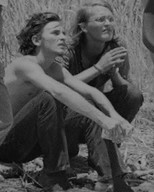
Henley (left) and Brooks (right), pictured at High Island Beach. August 10, 1973.

On August 10, 1973, Henley again accompanied police to Lake Sam Rayburn, where two more bodies were found buried just 10 feet (3 m) apart. As with the two bodies found the previous day, both victims had been tortured and severely beaten, particularly around the head. That afternoon, both Henley and Brooks accompanied police to High Island Beach, leading police to the shallow graves of two victims. On August 13, both Henley and Brooks again accompanied the police to High Island Beach, where four more bodies were found, making a total of 27 known victims – the worst killing spree in American history at the time. Henley initially insisted that there were two more bodies to be found inside the boat shed and that the bodies of two more boys had been buried at High Island Beach in 1972.

At the time, the killing spree was the worst case of serial murder, in terms of the number of victims, in the United States, exceeding the 25 murders attributed to Juan Corona, who had been arrested in California in 1971 for killing 25 men. The macabre record number of known victims attributed to a single murder case set by Corll and his accomplices was surpassed only in 1978 by John Wayne Gacy, who murdered 33 boys and young men and who admitted to being influenced by press coverage of the Houston Mass Murders to manacle his victims prior to their abuse and murder.

Families of Corll's victims were highly critical of the HPD, which had been quick to list the missing boys as runaways who had not been considered worthy of any major investigation. The families of the murdered youths asserted that the police should have noted an insidious trend in the pattern of disappearances of teenage boys from the Heights neighborhood; other family members complained the HPD had been dismissive of their adamant insistence that their sons had no reason to run away from home. Everett Waldrop, the father of Donald and Jerry Waldrop, complained that shortly after his sons had disappeared in 1971, he had informed police an acquaintance had observed Corll burying what appeared to be bodies at his boat shed. In response, the police performed a perfunctory search around the boat shed, before dismissing the reports as a hoax. Waldrop stated that on one of the many occasions when he visited the HPD, the police chief had simply told him, "Why are you down here? You know your boys are runaways." The mother of Gregory Malley Winkle stated: "You don't run away (from home) with nothing but a bathing suit and 80 cents." (Note: As a direct response to the Houston Mass Murder, then Texas Governor Dolph Briscoe established Operation Peace of Mind: a nationwide, toll-free hotline enabling runaway children and adolescents to leave confidential messages confirming their safety for parents who feared for their children and—if the runaway wished—re-initiating contact with their families. The hotline also provided assistance for runaways such as information on where to seek shelter, food or clothing.)

By May 1974, 21 of Corll's victims had been identified, with all but four of the youths having either lived in or had close connections to Houston Heights. Two more teenagers were identified in 1983 and 1985; one of whom, Richard Kepner, had originally lived in Humble, Texas, but had relocated to Spring Branch shortly before his disappearance to train as a carpenter's helper. The other youth, Willard Branch, lived in the Oak Forest district of Houston.

== Indictment ==
On August 13, a grand jury convened in Harris County to hear evidence against Henley and Brooks: the first witnesses to testify were Williams and Kerley, who testified to the events of August 7 and 8 leading to the death of Corll. Another witness who testified to his experience at the hands of Corll was William Ridinger, who recounted his abuse at Corll's Schuler Street address before he was released. Also to testify at the hearing were the investigators who recounted the various statements and confessions provided by Henley and Brooks in the days following Corll's death and individuals tasked with supervising the exhumation of the victims' bodies.

After listening to over six hours of testimony, on August 14, the grand jury indicted Henley on three counts of murder and Brooks on one count. Bail for each youth was set at $100,000. Henley was not charged with the death of Corll, which prosecutors would ultimately rule on September 18 had been committed in self-defense.

By the time the grand jury had completed its investigation, Henley had been indicted for six murders, and Brooks for four. Both would later reject pretrial offers presented to them by Assistant District Attorney Don Lambright of life sentences in exchange for pleas of guilty to the murders for which they had been indicted. A pretrial motion that Henley undergo a psychiatric examination to determine whether he was mentally competent to stand trial was also opposed by his attorney, Charles Melder, upon the grounds the ruling would violate Henley's constitutional rights.

== Trials and convictions ==
=== Henley ===
Elmer Wayne Henley and David Owen Brooks were tried separately for their roles in the murders. Henley was brought to trial before Judge Preston Dial in San Antonio on July 1, 1974, charged with six murders committed between March 1972 and July 1973. Upon advice from his defense counsel, Henley did not take the stand to testify. One of his attorneys, William Gray, did cross-examine several witnesses, but the defense counsel did not call any witnesses or experts to testify on their behalf.

The prosecution called twenty-four witnesses, including Kerley and Ridinger, and introduced eighty-two pieces of evidence, including Corll's torture board and one of the boxes used to transport the victims. Inside the box, police had found hair which examiners testified came from both Cobble and Henley. The defense called no witnesses to testify on Henley's behalf.

One of the witnesses to testify as to Henley's involvement in the abductions and murders on behalf of the prosecution was Detective David Mack Mullican, who read from Henley's written statements. In one part of his confession, Henley had described luring two of the victims for whose murder he had been brought to trial, Cobble and Jones, to Corll's Pasadena residence. Henley had confessed that after their initial abuse and torture at Corll's home, Cobble and Jones each had one wrist and ankle bound to the same side of Corll's torture board. The youths were then forced by Corll to fight each other with the promise that the one who beat the other to death would be allowed to live. After they had spent several hours beating each other, Jones was tied to a board and forced to watch Cobble again be assaulted, tortured, and shot to death before he himself was again raped, tortured, and strangled with a Venetian blind cord. (Note: Henley would later claim that Jones was murdered prior to Cobble and that Cobble was so distraught at witnessing his friend's strangulation that he suffered a cardiac arrest. According to Henley, he then partially revived Cobble before Corll ordered him to stop and simply shoot the youth to death.) Cobble and Jones were killed on July 27, 1973, two days after they had been reported missing. Several victims' parents had to leave the courtroom to regain their composure as police and medical examiners described how their relatives were tortured and murdered.

On July 15, 1974, both counsels presented their closing arguments to the jury: the prosecution seeking life imprisonment; the defense a verdict of not guilty. In his closing argument to the jury, District Attorney Carol Vance apologized for not being able to seek the death penalty, adding that the case was the "most extreme example of man's inhumanity to man I have ever seen."

The jury deliberated for 92 minutes before finding Henley guilty of all six murders for which he was tried. The following day, July 16, formal procedures to sentence Henley for the six guilty verdicts began, and on August 8, Judge Preston Dial ordered that Henley serve each 99-year sentence consecutively (totaling 594 years), and he was transferred to the Huntsville Unit to formally begin his sentence.

Henley appealed his sentence and conviction, contending the jury in his initial trial had not been sequestered, that his attorneys' objections to news media being present in the courtroom had been overruled, and citing that his defense team's attempts to present evidence contending that the initial trial should not have been held in San Antonio had also been overruled by the judge. Henley's appeal was upheld and he was awarded a retrial in December 1978.

Henley's retrial began on June 18, 1979. This second trial was held in Corpus Christi, with Henley again represented by defense attorneys William Gray and Edwin Pegelow. Henley's attorneys again attempted to have Henley's written statements ruled inadmissible. However, Judge Noah Kennedy ruled the written statements given by Henley on August 9, 1973, as admissible evidence. The retrial lasted nine days, with Henley's attorneys again calling no defense witnesses and again attacking the credibility of Henley's written confession. The defense also contended the evidence provided by the state "belonged to Dean Corll, not Elmer Wayne Henley". On June 27, 1979, the jury deliberated for over two hours before reaching their verdict; Henley was again convicted of six murders and again sentenced to six 99-year terms, only to run concurrently this time rather than consecutively.

=== Brooks ===
David Brooks was brought to trial before Judge William Hatten in Houston on February 27, 1975. He had been indicted for four murders committed between December 1970 and June 1973, but was brought to trial charged only with the June 1973 murder of 15-year-old William Ray Lawrence.

Brooks's defense attorney, Jim Skelton, argued that his client had not committed any murders and attempted to portray Corll and, to a lesser degree, Henley as being the active participants in the actual killings. Assistant District Attorney Tommy Dunn dismissed the defense's contention outright, at one point telling the jury: "Was he an innocent bystander? This defendant was in on this killing, this murderous rampage, from the very beginning. He tells you he was a cheerleader if nothing else. That's what he was telling you about his presence. You know he was in on it."

Skelton emphasized within his 40-minute closing argument that the state had based their entire case upon circumstantial evidence and that they had only proven Brooks to be an accessory to murder as opposed to guilty of murder itself, stating: "The state has proven David Owen Brooks of being an accessory to murder; the state has not established a murder case. They have proved accessory to murder—not murder. Before you convict, you've got to find an act to punish."

Brooks's trial lasted less than one week. The jury deliberated for just 90 minutes before they reached a verdict. He was found guilty of Lawrence's murder on March 4, 1975, and sentenced to life imprisonment. Brooks showed no emotion as the sentence was passed, although his wife burst into tears. Brooks also appealed his sentence, contending that the signed confessions used against him were taken without his being informed of his legal rights, but his appeal was dismissed in May 1979.

== Incarceration ==
Henley is serving his life sentence at the Mark Stiles Unit in Jefferson County, Texas. Successive parole applications dating from July 1980 have been denied. He was most recently denied parole in November 2025.

Brooks served his life sentence at the Terrell Unit near Rosharon, Texas. He died of COVID-19-related complications at a Galveston hospital on May 28, 2020, at the age of 65. Brooks is buried at Captain Joe Byrd Cemetery in Walker County.

== Victims ==
Corll and his accomplices are known to have killed a minimum of twenty-nine teenagers and young men between September 1970 and August 1973, although it is suspected that the true number of victims is higher. As Corll was killed immediately prior to his murders being discovered, the true number of victims he had claimed will never be known. Twenty-seven of Corll's known victims have been identified, and the identity of a twenty-eighth victim whose body has never been found, Mark Scott, is conclusively known. All of these victims were killed by either shooting, strangulation or a combination of both.

=== 1970 ===
- September 25: Jeffrey Alan Konen, 18. A student at the University of Texas at Austin abducted while hitchhiking from Austin to the Braeswood Place district of Houston. He was buried at High Island Beach.
- December 13: James Eugene Glass, 14. An acquaintance of Corll who also knew Brooks. Glass was last seen by his brother in the company of Danny Yates walking toward the exit of the church the trio had attended. He was strangled with a cord and buried inside the boat shed.
- December 13: Danny Michael Yates, 14. Lured with his friend James Glass from a Heights evangelical rally by Brooks to Corll's Yorktown apartment. He and his friend were strangled before being buried in a common grave in Corll's boat shed.

=== 1971 ===
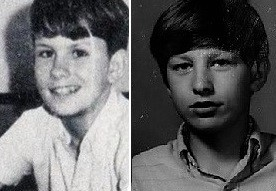
Donald (left) and Jerry Waldrop

- January 30: Donald Wayne Waldrop, 15. Disappeared with his brother while walking home from a friend's house. According to Brooks, Donald's father, who was a builder, was working on the apartment next to Corll's at the time that Donald and his brother were murdered.
- January 30: Jerry Lynn Waldrop, 13. The youngest of Corll's victims. He and his brother were strangled the day after their abduction and buried in a common grave inside Corll's boat shed.
- March 9: Randell Lee Harvey, 15. Disappeared on his way to his job as a gas station attendant; he was shot once in the head and buried in Corll's boat shed. Remains identified October 2008.
- May 29: David William Hilligiest, 13. One of Henley's earliest childhood friends; Hilligiest was last seen in the company of his friend Gregory Malley Winkle walking to a local swimming pool, before climbing into a white van.
- May 29: Gregory Malley Winkle, 16. A former employee of Corll Candy Company and boyfriend of Randell Harvey's sister. Winkle last phoned his mother claiming he and Hilligiest were swimming in Freeport. His body was found in the boat shed with the cord used to strangle him knotted around his neck.
- July 1: Donald John Falcon, 17. Originally from Corpus Christi. Falcon was last seen close to his parents' West University Place apartment complex. Several appendage bones belonging to Falcon were recovered from the boat shed in 1973 and identified via DNA analysis in 2014.
- August 17: Ruben Willfard Watson Haney, 17. Left his home to visit the cinema on the afternoon of August 17. Haney later called his mother to tell her he was spending the evening with Brooks. He was gagged, strangled and buried in Corll's boat shed.

=== 1972 ===
- March 24: Frank Anthony Aguirre, 18. Aguirre had been engaged to marry Rhonda Williams, whose presence in Corll's house would later spark the fatal confrontation between Henley and Corll. He was strangled and buried at High Island Beach.
- April 20: Mark Steven Scott, 17. An acquaintance of both Henley and Brooks who was killed at Corll's Schuler Street address. He was forced to write a letter to his parents claiming that he had found a job in Austin. According to Henley, Scott was strangled by himself and Corll the following morning and buried at High Island Beach, although his remains were never found.
- May 21: Johnny Ray Delome, 16. A Heights youth who was last seen with his friend walking to a local store to purchase soft drinks. He was shot in the head, then strangled by Henley with the assistance of Corll.
- May 21: Billy Gene Baulch Jr., 17. A former employee of Corll Candy Company. Baulch was forced to write a letter to his parents claiming he and Delome had found employment "for a trucker loading and unloading from Houston to Washington" before he was strangled by Henley and buried at High Island Beach.
- July 19: Steven Kent Sickman, 17. Sickman was last seen leaving a party on Ella Boulevard. He suffered several fractured ribs before he was strangled with a nylon cord and buried in the boat shed. Remains misidentified December 1993 and correctly identified March 2011.
- c. August 21: Roy Eugene Bunton, 19. Disappeared on his way to work at a shoe store. He was shot twice in the head and buried in the boat shed. Remains misidentified October 1973 and correctly identified November 2011.
- October 3: Wally Jay Simoneaux, 14. Lured with his friend into Brooks's Corvette on the evening of October 3. Simoneaux attempted to phone his mother at Corll's residence before the call was terminated. He was strangled and buried in the boat shed.

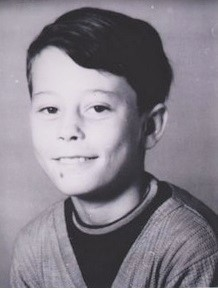
Richard Hembree

- October 3: Richard Edward Hembree, 13. Last seen alongside his friend in a vehicle parked outside a Heights grocery store. He was shot in the mouth and strangled at Corll's Westcott Towers address.
- c. November 1: Willard Karmon Branch Jr., 18. The son of an HPD officer who subsequently died of a heart attack in the search for his son. Branch was emasculated before he was shot in the head and buried in the boat shed. Remains identified July 1985.
- November 11: Richard Alan Kepner, 19. Vanished on his way to call his fiancée from a pay phone, he was strangled and buried at High Island Beach. Remains identified September 1983.

=== 1973 ===
- February 3: Joseph Allen Lyles, 17. An acquaintance of Corll who lived on the same street as Brooks. He was seen by Brooks to be "grabbed" by Corll at his Wirt Road address and was subsequently buried at Jefferson County Beach. Remains located August 1983 and identified November 2009.
- June 4: William Ray Lawrence, 15. A friend of Henley who phoned his father to ask if he could go fishing with "some friends." He was kept alive by Corll for three days before he was strangled with a cord and buried at Lake Sam Rayburn.
- June 15: Raymond Stanley Blackburn, 20. A married man from Baton Rouge, Louisiana, who vanished while hitchhiking from the Heights to see his newborn child. Blackburn had arrived in Houston three months before his abduction to work on a construction project. He was strangled by Corll at his Lamar Drive residence and buried at Lake Sam Rayburn.
- July 7: Homer Louis Garcia, 15. Met Henley while both youths were enrolled at a Bellaire driving school. He was shot in the head and chest and left to bleed to death in Corll's bathtub before being buried at Lake Sam Rayburn.
- July 12: John Manning Sellars, 17. An Orange County youth killed two days before his 18th birthday. Sellars was killed by four gunshots to the chest and buried at High Island Beach. He was the only victim to be buried fully clothed.
- July 19: Michael Anthony Baulch, 15. Corll had killed his older brother, Billy, the previous year. He was strangled and buried at Lake Sam Rayburn. Remains identified September 2010.
- July 25: Marty Ray Jones, 18. Jones was last seen along with his friend and roommate, Charles Cobble, walking along 27th Street in the company of Henley. He was strangled with a Venetian blind cord and buried in the boat shed.

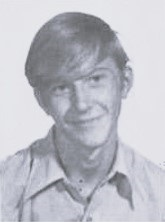
Charles Cobble

- July 25: Charles Cary Cobble, 17. A school friend of Henley whose wife was pregnant at the time of his murder; Cobble last phoned his father in a state of hysteria claiming he and Jones had been kidnapped by drug dealers. His body, shot twice in the head, was found in the boat shed.
- August 3: James Stanton Dreymala, 13. Corll's final victim. Dreymala was last seen riding his bicycle in Pasadena; he last called his girlfriend claiming he was in the Montrose neighborhood of Houston. He was strangled and buried in the boat shed.

Footnotes

- At Henley's trial in 1974, Harris County medical examiner Joseph Jachimczyk raised questions as to whether John Sellars was actually a victim of Corll. Sellars, a U.S. Marine who had been reported missing on July 12, 1973, had been killed by four gunshot wounds to the chest fired from a rifle, whereas all of Corll's other known victims had been either shot with the same pistol that Henley had used to kill Corll, strangled, or both. Moreover, Sellars's car had been found burned-out in Starks, Louisiana, one week after Sellars had disappeared.
- Police had been led to Sellars's body on August 13, 1973, by a trucker who recalled conversing with a youth he believed to be Henley after he had seen a car stuck in the sand close to where Sellars's body was subsequently found. The youth had rebuffed the trucker's offer to help free the car, stating he had two friends with him who would free the vehicle. Neither Henley nor Brooks specifically mentioned Sellars being a victim of Corll's in their confessions, nor have they disputed his being a victim, although Henley had informed investigators he was unaware of any victims having been buried at High Island since late 1972.
- The official tally of victims was reduced to twenty-six in 1974 after Jachimczyk testified Sellars "probably was not" murdered by Corll and his accomplices. (Note: Although Jachimczyk testified as to his uncertainty as to whether John Sellars was a victim of Corll at Henley's trial, he did emphasize he could not state definitively Sellars had not been a victim of the Houston Mass Murders.) However, Sellars was of the same age as Corll's known victims, although his grave on High Island Beach was located over two miles from the other five victims buried at this location. In addition, his body was found bound hand and foot with rope as other victims had been, and Sellars's autopsy indicates a possibility of being sexually assaulted before or after death.

=== Forensic developments ===
In June 2008, Sharon Derrick, a forensic anthropologist with the medical examiner's office in Houston, released digital images of Corll's three still-unidentified victims. These victims were listed as ML73-3349, ML73-3356 and ML73-3378. Two of the unidentified victims were found buried in the boat shed and were estimated to have been killed in 1971 or 1972. ML73-3378 was buried at Lake Sam Rayburn just 10 feet (3 m) from the body of Homer Garcia, who had disappeared on July 7, 1973.

On October 17, 2008, ML73-3349 was identified as Randell Lee Harvey, a Heights teenager who had been reported missing on March 11, 1971 – two days after he had disappeared. Harvey, who had been shot through the eye, was wearing a navy blue jacket with red lining, jeans and lace-up boots. A plastic orange pocket comb was also found alongside his body.

A body found on a beach in Jefferson County on August 4, 1983, has been conclusively linked to Corll. The scattered skeletal remains were discovered within and close to plastic sheeting near an eroding sandbank, along with sections of rope. These remains were listed as ML83-6849. The body was identified November 11, 2009, through DNA analysis as 17-year-old Joseph Lyles, a Spring Branch teenager who had disappeared on February 3, 1973. (Note: Several bones, including the hyoid bone, were never recovered from the site of Lyles's burial. No precise cause of death could be determined.) Lyles is known to have both visited Corll's apartment and to have lived on the same street as Brooks. He was listed as a possible victim of Corll after the other murders were discovered in 1973. At the time of his disappearance, Corll resided in an apartment at 1855 Wirt Road, where he lived between January 20 and March 1, 1973, when he moved to his father's Pasadena bungalow. Brooks had specifically stated Corll had "got one boy by himself" during the time he lived at this address. In addition, at the time that Lyles disappeared, Henley had temporarily moved to Mount Pleasant, which leaves a strong possibility that Corll had killed Lyles without the assistance of Henley.

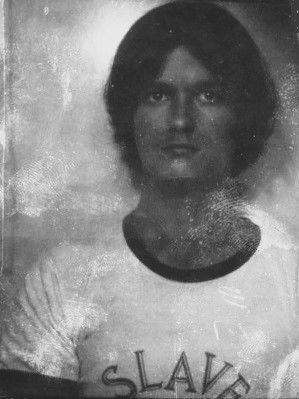
Michael Baulch. His body was correctly identified via DNA analysis in 2010.

On September 13, 2010, DNA analysis was able to confirm that the unidentified victim known as ML73-3378 was actually Michael Anthony Baulch, who had incorrectly been identified as case file ML73-3333: the second victim unearthed from the boat shed. Baulch had disappeared en route to a barbershop on July 19, 1973—a year after his brother, Billy, had been murdered by Corll. The 1973 misidentification of Michael Baulch was discovered as a result of an independent investigation conducted by freelance writers Barbara Gibson and Debera Phinney, who contacted Derrick with a tip indicating that the second victim unearthed from the boat shed had been misidentified; upon conducting additional DNA testing, Derrick discovered their suspicions were correct.

Henley had stated in his confession to police that he and Corll had "choked" Michael Baulch and buried him at Lake Sam Rayburn. The unidentified victim mistakenly identified as Baulch had been killed by two gunshots to the head and buried inside the boat shed. Three factors helped lead to the 1973 misidentification of Baulch: Michael's parents had previously filed a missing persons report on their son (who had previously left home to search for his older brother) in August 1972—precisely the same time as the second victim unearthed from the boat shed was estimated to have been killed. This was the only missing persons report on file for Michael Baulch. In addition, the victim was of a similar height to Baulch and circumstantial dental fractures had also helped facilitate the misidentification.

On November 4, 2011, the victim mistakenly identified as Baulch (case file ML73-3333) was identified through DNA analysis as Roy Eugene Bunton, a Heights teenager who was last seen by his family heading for work at a Houston shoe store on or about August 21, 1972. Bunton's family had always believed him to be a victim of Corll and had contacted Derrick in 2009 to submit a DNA sample for comparison with the unidentified bodies. Initially, the results conducted had been negative due to the misidentification of Bunton's remains as being those of Baulch. However, upon discovering the 1973 misidentification of Baulch's remains, DNA samples obtained from Bunton's family were compared to those taken from the body mistakenly identified as being that of Baulch and these proved to be a conclusive match to Bunton.

In the confession given by Henley on August 9, 1973, the youth had stated that victim Mark Scott had been strangled and buried at High Island. Brooks had also stated in his confession that Scott was likely buried at High Island. Scott had been a blond youth who had not had any teeth extracted prior to his disappearance; however, Elizabeth Johnson of the Harris County Medical Institute had concluded in 1993 that the fifteenth set of remains unearthed from the boat shed—which had physical characteristics such as dark brown hair and two extracted molars—were those of Scott. Johnson had based her findings upon comparison of DNA analysis of a blood sample taken from Scott's mother with the remains unearthed from the boat shed, stating with a 98.5% degree of accuracy the decedent had been related to Scott's mother.

In a 2010 interview granted to investigative reporter Barbara Gibson, Henley disputed the 1993 identification of a victim buried in the boat shed as Scott and reiterated his claim that Scott had been buried at High Island "in the sand: fetal position; head up," adding that he had repeatedly argued this point with Jachimczyk.

As a result of Henley's claims, DNA tests on the body initially identified as Scott were again tested against samples of DNA taken from Scott's family. In March 2011, DNA analysis confirmed that the victim known as ML73-3355 had been misidentified and the same month, the victim was identified as Steven Kent Sickman, a 17-year-old who was last seen walking down West 34th Street shortly before midnight on July 19, 1972. He was murdered at Corll's Westcott Towers address. Sickman's mother had reported her son missing shortly after his disappearance, but police had been unwilling to conduct a search for the youth, telling the mother that he was 17 years old and that unless they found a body, there was nothing they could do to assist her. Had Henley not been adamant in his assertion that the body of Scott had been misidentified, it is likely Sickman would have never been conclusively confirmed as a victim of Corll.

All six bodies directly linked to the Houston Mass Murders found at High Island have been identified. As Henley's claim that the victim known as ML73-3355 was not Scott has been proven to be correct, a strong suspicion remains that Scott's body remains buried on High Island.

Four arm bones discovered between the remains of the twelfth and sixteenth victims discovered within the boat shed on August 9, 1973, would be determined via DNA analysis to belong to neither victim. Via familial DNA profiling, in 2014, the University of North Texas Health Science Center determined all four of these appendages belonged to a 17-year-old named Donald John Falcon, who had disappeared on July 1, 1971. Although not officially confirmed as a twenty-ninth victim of Corll—with Falcon's cause of death listed as "unknown" due to the fact a human can survive the severance/removal of the four forearm bones in question—several forensic anthropologists, including Sharon Derrick, consider Falcon a definitive twenty-ninth victim of Corll, with the majority of his remains likely still buried in the boat shed.

== Unidentified victim ==
Corll's only known unidentified victim—the sixteenth body found in the boat shed—was in an advanced stage of decomposition at the time of his discovery, leading investigators to deduce that he had likely been killed in 1971 or 1972. This unidentified victim was found wearing red-white-and-blue striped swimming trunks, cowboy boots, a leather bracelet and a long-sleeved, khaki-colored T-shirt decorated with a peace symbol, leading investigators to conclude that he was likely killed in the summer months. In addition, his T-shirt bore a handwritten inscription believed to read either "LB4MF", "LBHMF", or "L84MF". He had dark hair and may have had spina bifida, a congenital disability that could have affected his gait, or caused chronic pain. This victim has been referred to as "John Houston Doe" since the discovery of his body, but is also informally known as "Swimsuit Boy".

This unidentified victim was found buried near the entrance to the boat shed between the bodies of Steven Sickman and Ruben Haney, whereas the bodies of the victims killed between December 1970 and May 1971 were found buried at the rear of the shed. It is likely, though not conclusive, that the unidentified sixteenth victim found within the boat shed may have been killed in the late summer or early fall of 1971. Derrick has stated that she believes this particular victim may be named Harman, Harmon or French, as the only outstanding missing persons reports relating to youths from the Houston area dated between 1970 and 1973, which fit the forensic profile of this unknown youth, include these surnames. One of these individuals, 15-year-old John Harmon, had been a Heights teenager reported missing in 1971. He is last known to have phoned his parents claiming to need money in much the same manner as victims Charles Cobble and Marty Jones had been forced to telephone their parents before their murder.

Derrick has stated she has reason to believe this victim may be named Robert (or "Bobby") French, adding she has received an anonymous package containing a series of photographs potentially depicting this individual taken shortly before his murder, and that the sender of this package named this individual as one Bobby French.

In 2022, authorities announced that the National Center for Missing and Exploited Children and the Harris County Institute of Forensic Science are actively working together to identify this victim. An updated facial reconstruction was released to the media in August 2023.

== Possible additional victims ==
=== Unrecovered remains ===
Forty-two boys had vanished from Houston Heights between 1970 and Corll's death in 1973. The police were heavily criticized for curtailing the search for further victims once the record set by Juan Corona for having the most victims had been surpassed. After finding the 26th and 27th bodies, tied together, at High Island Beach on August 13, the search for any further victims was terminated, despite Henley's insistence that two further bodies had been buried on the beach in 1972. A curious feature about this final discovery was the presence of two extra bones (an arm bone and a pelvis) in the grave, indicating at least one additional, undiscovered victim. Investigators later returned to the scene where these extra bones were discovered in efforts to locate any additional human remains at the site of their discovery, although this search yielded no further remains. (Note: Following the decision to terminate the search for victims' bodies in August 1973, one lieutenant from the HPD is known to have remarked: "I don't know if [we have] found all the bodies or not", before adding, "What difference does it make?")

The two bodies that Henley had insisted were still buried on the beach may have been those of Scott and Lyles. In light of developments relating to the identifications of victims, the body of Scott still lies undiscovered at High Island, while Lyles's remains were only found by chance in 1983. Had the search for bodies continued, both victims would have likely been discovered. Following Hurricane Ike in 2008, the area of High Island Beach where Corll is known to have buried his victims remains submerged, leaving a strong possibility that Scott's body will never be found. Furthermore, Henley also insisted the bodies of two further victims remained buried within the boat shed. His claims were disputed, with one officer informing reporters on August 9: "If there's nineteen [victims] in here, we missed two, but we've been over every inch of this ground."

How that man was able to go out to that storage shed, time after time, and bury one more dead boy is something I'll never understand. You get close to evil like that, no matter how long ago it was, and it never leaves you.

— Detective David Mullican, recollecting the Houston Mass Murders, April 2011.

In addition to the arm bones recovered from the boat shed identified via DNA analysis in 2014 as belonging to victim Donald Falcon, investigators also recovered a portion of a child's cranium determined to belong to a boy of either nine or ten years of age. A forensic analysis of this skull portion revealed the condition of this section of bone to be similar to other bones recovered at this location and likely not an incidental archeological recovery, thus indicating the bodies of two Corll victims—one still unidentified—remain buried at this location.

Although in his August 10 confession, Brooks had informed investigators he believed victim Jerry Waldrop was Corll's youngest victim, he did inform investigators that afternoon that the youngest murder victim had been "about nine" and the son of a grocer. Contemporary investigative records do refer to a missing prepubescent boy named Albright whom investigators had considered as a possible individual Brooks had been referring to; however, all the victims recovered in 1973 had been older than this child.

Former employees of Corll Candy Company recalled Corll doing a lot of digging in the years leading up to 1968, when his mother's third marriage was deteriorating and the firm was failing. Corll stated he was burying spoiled candy to avoid contamination by insects. He subsequently cemented over the floor. He was also observed digging in waste ground that was later converted into a parking lot. These former workers also recalled that Corll had rolls of clear plastic of precisely the same type used to bury his victims. Moreover, co-workers at HL&P also stated that, from the earliest days of his employment, Corll had repeatedly retained coils of used nylon cord that would otherwise have been discarded. This brand of cord was the same type used to strangle and bind the bodies of many of his victims. The suspicion is that Corll began killing much earlier than 1970 and had been abusing youths prior to this date.

Moreover, in one interview, Brooks claimed that Corll's first murder victim was a youth killed at an apartment complex located at 1353 Judiway Street, where Corll had lived between October 7 and November 10, 1968, and when Brooks himself had been thirteen years old. The earliest of Corll's victims mentioned by Brooks in his confession were two teenage boys killed at 3300 Yorktown, where Corll had only resided between October 1970 and January 1971. Corll's earliest double murder, that of Glass and Yates, took place in December 1970; those victims were actually killed at Corll's Yorktown address. A possibility exists that the earliest double murder victims were Glass and Yates; however, in his confession to police, Brooks specifically described Glass as being murdered at an altogether separate address Corll had resided in at the time of his first double murder. In addition, Brooks only knew the location of Konen's body at High Island Beach because Corll had shown it to him. (Note: Brooks initially named the victim buried in this grave as Ruben Haney. Henley would also inform investigators Corll had informed him he had buried the body of Haney at High Island Beach.) It is possible that the initial double murder Brooks had discovered Corll in the process of committing occurred after the murder of Konen and before those of Glass and Yates.

The confessions of Henley and Brooks separately describe two murders having occurred on unknown dates between September 25, 1971, and early March 1972: a youth Brooks described as having been murdered at Corll's apartment on Columbia Street immediately prior to Henley's involvement in the crimes and the unidentified first teenager whose abduction Henley had participated in shortly prior to the murder of Frank Aguirre. However, only one unidentified murder victim linked to the case remains meaning that, if the unidentified victim discovered in the boat shed is actually one of these two individuals, a further victim remains undiscovered. These details, alongside the two additional bones that were found with the 26th and 27th victims discovered at High Island, the section of a child's cranium recovered from the boat shed, plus the unidentified victim killed at Judiway Street, indicate a minimum of four and possibly seven more unknown victims.

There are two suspiciously long gaps between known victims in the chronology of Corll's known murders. His last known victim of 1971 was Ruben Watson Haney, who disappeared on August 17. The first victim of 1972 was Frank Aguirre, who disappeared on March 24, meaning no known victims were killed for seven months. Moreover, Corll also is not known to have killed between February 3 and June 4, 1973.

In March 1973, a Mr. and Mrs. Abernathy had reported to Galveston County authorities that they had observed three men carrying and burying a "long, wrapped bundle" at Galveston Beach. The couple identified two of the men as Corll and Henley. The third individual had long, blond hair—like Brooks. As the couple watched the trio, one of the men (whom they later identified as Henley) advanced upon their car with such a menacing expression that the couple felt compelled to drive away. Two women had also observed three men digging at the beach in May 1973—one of whom they positively identified as Brooks. However, police were again unwilling to extend the search.

A Polaroid image depicting a likely unknown victim of Corll. This image was taken in 1972 or 1973.

In February 2012, a picture was released to the news media of a likely unknown victim of Corll. The color Polaroid image had been found in the personal possessions of Henley, which had been stored by his family since his arrest in 1973. The image depicts a blond-haired teenage youth in handcuffs, strapped to a device upon Corll's floor, alongside a toolbox known to contain various instruments Corll used to torture his victims. The individual depicted has been ruled out by the Harris County Medical Examiner as being any of Corll's known victims, including his one remaining known unidentified victim. Henley himself has stated that the picture must have been taken after he had acquired a Polaroid camera in 1972—although he is adamant that he has no idea who this boy is. (Note: According to some sources, Henley's mother identified the teenager in the photograph as her son Ronald, although news reports pertaining to this development were not modified or retracted.) Given that Henley became acquainted with Corll in 1972, it is likely this boy would have been killed in 1972 or 1973.

=== Outstanding missing persons cases ===
The January 14, 1973, disappearance of 16-year-old Norman Lamar Prater was initially tentatively linked to Corll. Prater was last seen by his mother in Dallas in the company of an adult male and two teenage youths with shoulder-length hair; he had previously lived in the same neighborhood as most of Corll's known victims and had attended the same high school as Henley between 1970 and 1971. Prater is known to have continued to visit his father in Houston during weekends after he moved with his mother to Dallas. No firm evidence existed to link Prater's disappearance to Corll and his accomplices and Prater was later confirmed to have died in an unrelated July 1973 hit-and-run incident in Aransas County, Texas.

A further teenager, 16-year-old Rodney Harris, is also speculated to be a victim of Dean Corll. Harris—a Spring Woods High School student—had disappeared from Spring Branch on February 21, 1973, less than three weeks after victim Joseph Lyles. He was last seen alive climbing into a sedan close to his family's English Oaks apartment. As with Prater, DNA analysis has excluded Harris as being the sole unidentified victim of Corll.

Contemporary investigative records indicate two further teenagers reported missing in 1972 may also have been victims of Corll, although no missing persons report for either of these individuals—Fred Holmes, missing since March 14, and John Green, missing since December 8—has been located.

== Potential association with a national sex ring ==
During a routine investigation in February 1975, the HPD discovered a large cache of pornographic pictures and films depicting boys as young as eight, most of whom were from the Heights. Of the sixteen individuals depicted within the films and photos, eleven of the individuals appeared to be among Corll's known victims who had been identified by this date; other individuals in the cache were underage at the time the images and films had been taken, but had reached the legal age of consent by the time of the discoveries and their questioning by authorities, indicating the material had been accrued over many years.

The discovery raised the disturbing possibility that the statements Corll had given to both Henley and Brooks that he was associated with a Dallas-based organization which "bought and sold boys" may indeed have held a degree of truth. The discovery of the material in Houston in 1975 subsequently led to the arrest of five individuals in Santa Clara, California, including the owner of the warehouse where the cache had been stored, Roy Ames, a known producer of child pornography, whose name police had found on a card in Corll's wallet. No direct link in these arrests to Corll was proven, as the HPD declined to pursue any possible link to the killings, stating they felt Corll's victims' families had "suffered enough."

On August 15, 1973, just two days after investigators had uncovered the final bodies initially linked to the Houston Mass Murders, investigators in Dallas uncovered a nationwide homosexual procurement ring operated by John David Norman. This police raid seized a card filing system containing up to 10,000 names of individuals across the United States ascribed to this network and the personal details of numerous teenage boys exploited by this sex trafficking ring.

There is still no conclusive evidence to suggest that Corll had ever solicited any of his victims in this manner, not only because the HPD chose not to pursue this potential possibility, but also because neither Brooks nor Henley ever mentioned having met any individuals from the "organization" Corll had claimed he was involved with. (Note: In a December 2007 interview, Brooks would allude to Corll having been involved in a "gay porn ring" which actively sent "doped-up kids to California" to participate in child pornography, adding: "All that was true ... and no one fully investigated at the time.") In addition, neither mentioned having seen any of the victims either filmed, photographed, or released from the devices Corll restrained his victims to until after their rape, torture, and murder. The arrests in Santa Clara do, however, suggest possible validity in Brooks's statements to police that Corll had informed him that his earliest murder victims had been buried in California.

== Media ==
=== Film ===
- A film loosely inspired by the Houston Mass Murders, Freak Out, was released in 2003. The film was directed by Brad Jones, who also starred as Corll. This film largely focuses upon the last night of Corll's life, prior to Henley shooting him and contacting authorities. The film has received mostly mixed to positive reviews.
- Production of a film directly based upon the Houston Mass Murders, In a Madman's World, finished in 2014. Directed by Josh Vargas, the film is directly based upon Henley's life before, during, and immediately after his involvement with Corll and Brooks. Limited edition copies of the film were released in 2017.

=== Bibliography ===
- Christian, Kimberly (2015). Horror in the Heights: The True Story of The Houston Mass Murders. CreateSpace. ISBN 978-1-515-19072-1.
- Gibson, Barbara (2023). Houston Mass Murders 1973: A True Crime Narrative. Independent. ISBN 979-8-882-66863-0.
- Gurwell, John K. (1974). Mass Murder in Houston. Cordovan Press.
- Hanna, David (1975). Harvest of Horror: Mass Murder in Houston. Belmont Tower.
- Jessel, David, ed. (1991). "Murder Casebook, Investigations into the Ultimate Crime – The Candy Man". Murder Casebook (102). Marshall Cavendish. ISBN 978-0-748-53511-8.
- Johns, Bill (2025). The Candy Man - Dean Corll and the Houston Mass Murders: A True Crime Investigation of America's Most Overlooked Serial Killer. Independent. ISBN 979-8-268-69909-8.
- Olsen, Jack (1974). The Man with the Candy: The Story of the Houston Mass Murders. Simon & Schuster. ISBN 978-0-7432-1283-0.
- Olsen, Lise (2025). The Scientist and the Serial Killer: The Search for Houston's Lost Boys. Random House Publishing Group. ISBN 978-0-593-59568-8.
- Ramsland, Katherine (2014). Dean Corll, Elmer Wayne Henley & David Brooks: The Game of Boys. Grinning Man Press. ISBN 978-0-993-82320-6.
- Ramsland, Katherine; Ullman, Tracy (2024). The Serial Killer's Apprentice: The True Story of How Houston's Deadliest Murderer Turned a Kid Into a Killing Machine. Penzler Publishers. ISBN 978-1-613-16495-2.
- Rosewood, Jack (2015). Dean Corll: The True Story of The Houston Mass Murders. CreateSpace. ISBN 978-1-517-48500-9.
- Williams, Paul (1994). "The Pied Piper". Real-Life Crimes. No. 130. Eaglemoss Publications Ltd. ISBN 978-1-858-75022-4.
- Wilson, Colin, ed. (1999). "Murder in Mind – Dean Corll". Murder in Mind (80). Marshall Cavendish. ISSN 1364-5803.

=== Television ===
- A 1982 documentary, The Killing of America, features a section devoted to the Houston Mass Murders.
- FactualTV has screened a documentary focusing upon the murders committed by Corll and his accomplices. Sharon Derrick is among those interviewed for the documentary.
- Investigation Discovery has broadcast a documentary focusing upon the Houston Mass Murders within their documentary series, Most Evil. This documentary, entitled Manipulators, features an interview with Henley conducted by a former forensic psychologist named Kris Mohandie.
- The crime thriller series Mindhunter has broadcast an episode mentioning the Houston Mass Murders. This episode was first broadcast on August 16, 2019.
- Houston-based news channel KPRC-TV has broadcast an episode focusing upon the Houston Mass Murders as part of their crime series The Evidence Room. Hosted by investigative reporter Robert Arnold, this 28-minute episode, titled The Candy Man's Henchmen, was first broadcast in February 2023.
- The Serial Killer's Apprentice. Commissioned by Investigation Discovery, this two-hour documentary was first broadcast on August 17, 2025, and contains audio recordings of Henley's interviews with forensic psychologist Katherine Ramsland.

=== Podcast ===
- The Clown and the Candyman (2020–2021). An eight-part podcast series narrated by Jacqueline Bynon, investigating the murders committed by Dean Corll and John Wayne Gacy, their respective potential links to a nationwide sex trafficking network, and the ongoing efforts to identify their victims.

== See also ==
- List of serial killers by number of victims
- List of serial killers in the United States

== Cited works and further reading ==
- Anderson, William Bryan (1987). Notable Crime Investigations. Charles C. Thomas Publications Ltd. ISBN 978-0-398-05372-7.
- Cawthorne, Nigel; Tibballs, Geoff (1993). Killers. Boxtree. pp. 408–412. ISBN 0-752-20850-0.
- Davis, Carol Ann (2014). Couples Who Kill. Allison & Busby. ISBN 978-0-749-01699-9.
- Foreman, Laura (1992). Serial Killers: True Crime. Time-Life Books. ISBN 978-0-783-50001-0.
- Franscell, Ron (2010). Crime Buff's Guide to Outlaw Texas. Guildford Press. ISBN 978-0-762-75965-1.
- Gurwell, John K. (1974). Mass Murder in Houston. Cordovan Press.
- Hanna, David (1975). Harvest of Horror: Mass Murder in Houston. Belmont Tower.
- Jeffers, H. Paul (1992). Profiles in Evil: Chilling Case Histories from the Files of the FBI's Violent Crime Unit. Warner Publishing. ISBN 978-0-751-50778-2.
- Keppel, Robert D.; Birnes, William J. (2003). The Psychology of Serial Killer Investigations: The Grisly Business Unit. Academic Press. p. 8. ISBN 978-0-124-04260-5.
- Lane, Brian; Gregg, Wilfred (1992). The Encyclopedia of Serial Killers. Headline Publishing. pp. 119–122. ISBN 978-0-747-23731-0.
- Lehto, Steven (2015). American Murder Houses: A Coast-to-Coast Tour of the Most Notorious Houses of Homicide. Penguin Publishing Group. ISBN 978-1-101-59301-1.
- Rahr, Larry (2016). A Cop for 43 Years. Page Publishing Incorporated. ISBN 978-1-684-09172-0.
- Sullivan, Terry; Maiken, Peter T. (2000). Killer Clown: The John Wayne Gacy Murders. Pinnacle. ISBN 0-7860-1422-9.
- Vance, Michael; Lomax, John (2014). Murder and Mayhem in Houston: Historic Bayou City Crime. The History Press. ISBN 978-1-626-19521-9.
- Varhola, Michael O. (2011). Texas Confidential: Sex, Scandal, Murder, and Mayhem in the Lone Star State. Clerisy Press. ISBN 978-1-57860-458-6.
- Whittington-Egan, Richard; Whittington-Egan, Molly (1992). The Murder Almanac. Neil Wilson Publishing. p. 51. ISBN 1-897784-04-X.
- Wilson, Colin (2013). A Plague of Murder: The Rise and Rise of Serial Killing in the Modern Age. Robinson Publishing. ISBN 978-1-854-87249-4.
- Wynn, Douglas (1996). On Trial for Murder. Pan Books. pp. 69–72. ISBN 978-0-330-33947-6.
