= Harris County Institute of Forensic Science =

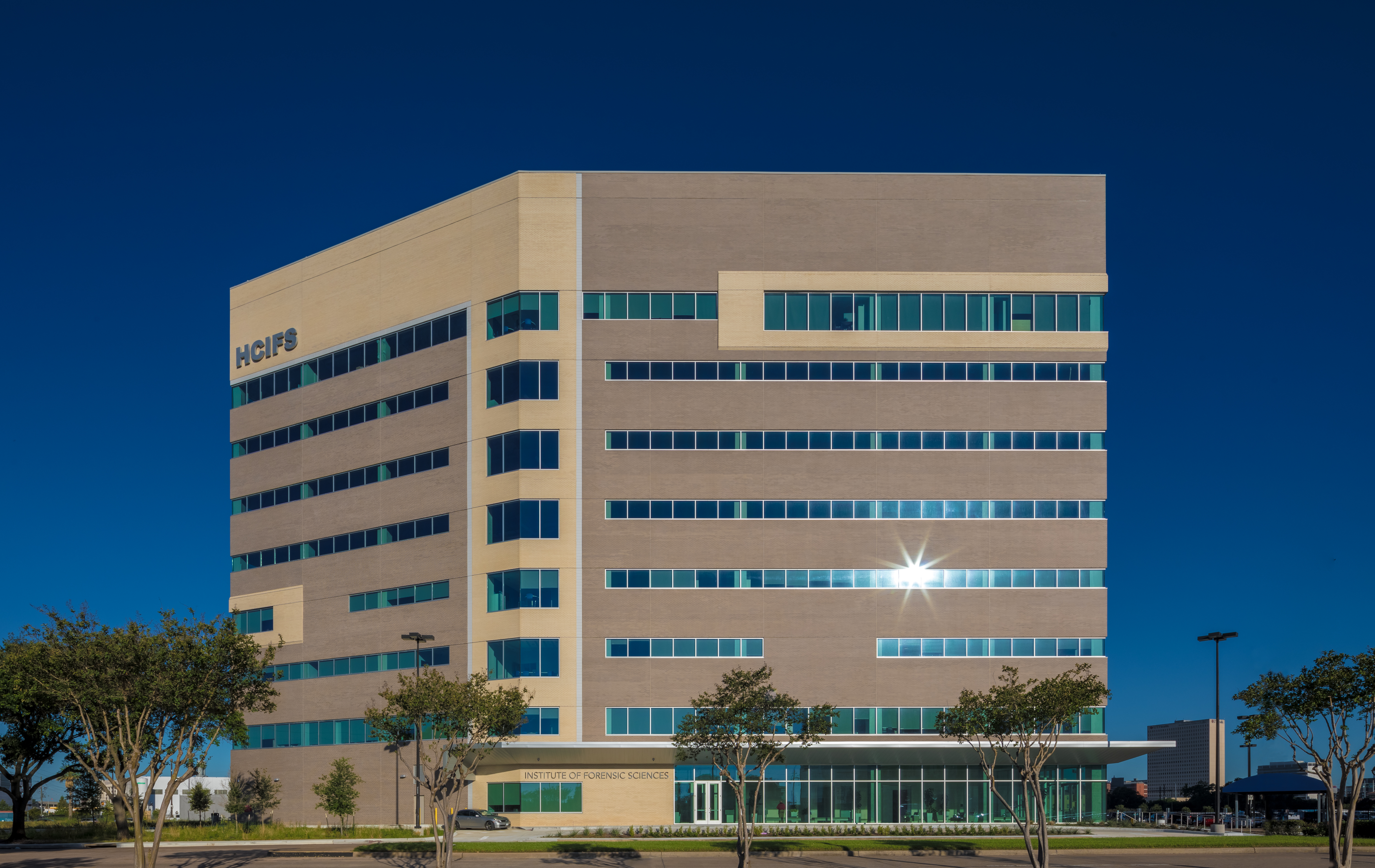
The Harris County Institute of Forensic Sciences in the Texas Medical Center serves as the Harris County Medical Examiner and Crime Laboratory.

The Harris County Institute of Forensic Sciences is a science-based, independent operation consisting of two distinct forensic services for the Harris County community – the Medical Examiner Service and the Crime Laboratory Service. The institute is located in Houston, Texas. The institute is a part of the Texas Medical Center.

The Medical Examiner Service investigates sudden death and deaths resulting from physical or chemical injury in order to determine cause and manner of death and to preserve evidence. The service encompasses the fields of Forensic Investigations, Forensic Pathology and Morgue Services, Forensic Anthropology, Forensic Imaging, and Histology.

The Crime Laboratory Service analyzes evidence and includes five distinct disciplines: Drug Chemistry, Firearms Identification, Forensic Genetics (serology/DNA), Forensic Toxicology and Trace Evidence.

== Accreditations ==
The institute maintains the following accreditations:

- Accreditation Council for Graduate Medical Education
- American Board of Forensic Toxicology
- National Accreditation Board Forensic Science Testing Laboratories program
- National Accreditation Board Forensic Inspection Bodies program
- National Association of Medical Examiners
- Texas Forensic Science Commission
- Texas Medical Association for Continuing Medical Education

== History ==
Harris County Commissioner's Court established the Office of the Harris County Medical Examiner on January 1, 1957, and became the first county in Texas with a Medical Examiner System. Jared E. Clarke, M.D., a Houston physician, was appointed Harris County's first Chief Medical Examiner and oversaw the administration of the office. Harris County Pathologist and Health Officer, W.W. Coulter, M.D., performed autopsies for the office at the Jefferson Davis Hospital.

Upon the retirement of Dr. Clarke, Joseph A. Jachimczyk, M.D., was appointed Chief Medical Examiner on August 31, 1960, and facilitated the move of the Harris County Medical Examiner's Office from the Jefferson Davis Hospital to the basement of the Ben Taub Hospital in the Texas Medical Center.

On June 16, 1983, a three-story Harris County forensic center broke ground on Old Spanish Trail in the Texas Medical Center. That same year, the Harris County Medical Examiner's Office became the 41st member institution of the Texas Medical Center. Named in honor of Chief Medical Examiner Joseph A. Jachimczyk, M.D., the Office of the Harris County Medical Examiner began full operation in the Joseph A. Jachimczyk Forensic Center of Harris County on December 1, 1984.

From 1986 to 1988, the Harris County Medical Examiner's Office experienced significant growth as it formed the foundation for its Crime Laboratory Service and began analysis for controlled substances, gunshot residue, serology (hairs and fibers) and drug testing. In 1990, the Harris County Commissioner's Court authorized a $3 million, three-floor expansion of the Joseph A. Jachimczyk Forensic Center. Construction was completed in 1991.

Upon the retirement of Dr. Jachimczyk in 1995, the Harris County Commissioner's Court appointed Joye M. Carter, M.D., as Harris County's new Chief Medical Examiner. Dr. Carter was the first woman to head a medical examiner's office in Texas.

Luis A. Sanchez, M.D., having joined the Office of the Harris County Chief Medical Examiner on June 4, 2001, as the Sr. Deputy Chief Medical Examiner, was appointed the interim Chief Medical Examiner in October 2002. On December 17, 2002, Harris County Commissioner's Court appointed Dr. Sanchez the Chief Medical Examiner for Harris County.

In November 2007, Harris County approved a bond for the construction of a new, state-of-the-art building for the Harris County Medical Examiner's Office to be located at 1861 Old Spanish Trail in the Texas Medical Center. The Harris County Medical Examiner's Office was renamed the Harris County Institute of Forensic Sciences in 2010 to reflect the full range of forensic services performed by the agency. Construction began on the new building for the Harris County Institute of Forensic Sciences in December 2013.

In 2017, The Harris County Institute of Forensic Sciences marked 60 years of service to the Harris County community as it launched full operations at its new, state-of-the-art facility.
