= Fat Papi =

Kurdish-New Zealand singer and rapper

- Born: Baban Hussain; 2003 or 2004 (age 22–23)
- Origin: Auckland, New Zealand
- Genre: Hip hop
- Occupation: Rapper
- Years active: 2023–present
- Label: Warner Chappell Music

Baban Hussain (Kurdish: بابان حسێن; born 2003 or 2004), professionally known as Fat Papi, is a Kurdish-New Zealand singer and rapper based in Auckland. Hussain started rapping in 2023. In 2026, Hussain began to collaborate with Owen Omen, an Australian producer known online as "prodshushy". After the release of their single "Freaked Out" in June, the song became the subject of a viral trend on social media. Users posted videos, showing off their bob cuts, which were set to the song. When "Freaked Out" charted on the Billboard Hot 100, Hussain became the first Kurdish artist to enter the chart. The song also entered charts in Australia and New Zealand. As a result of their song's success, he and Omen were signed to Warner Chappell Music in August.

== Early life ==
Baban Hussain was born in 2003 or 2004. (Note: Hussain was 22 in August 2026, placing his birth in either of those years.) His parents were Kurdish refugees who fled Iraq in 1999. Hussain was raised in Auckland, New Zealand, which is home to a small community of Kurds. He was the only Kurdish student at his school.

== Career ==
In 2023, Hussain began rapping under the stage name "Fat Papi". He taught himself to rap and produce music, developed his skills by freestyling over Skype, and worked out of a self-run studio in Auckland. In mid-2026, Hussain reached out on social media to Owen Omen, a bedroom producer known online as "prodshushy". Omen is of Papua New Guinean and Solomon Islander descent, and is based in Perth, Australia.

Since Hussain had just 800 followers in contrast to Omen's 20,000, he was unsure if Omen would even respond. Nevertheless, Hussain and Omen began working together and met in person for the first time in July. The two released a song together, "Back It Up", to moderate attention. Hussain's followers went from numbering hundreds to several thousand after he started working with Omen. Their desire to make a song similar to "Back It Up" led Omen to produce the beat of "Freaked Out", which eclipsed all of their earlier work in popularity.

On 4 June 2026, (Note: In contrast to other sources, The Guardian said that "Freaked Out" was released in May.) Hussain and Omen released "Freaked Out". At first, the song received little attention. After several previous attempts at promoting it online, Omen uploaded a short dance video set to a part of the song where Hussain raps, "Get that bag, you ain't ever comin' last." The clip garnered 1.5 million views. A few days later, Jocelyn Meiere, a British TikToker known online as "Miss Diva Bob", posted a video set to "Freaked Out" in which she showed off her bob cut. The on-screen caption read "reasons to get a bob". Apparently, the line "Get that bag" had been interpreted as "Get that bob".

The TikTok went viral, gaining over six million views and inspiring numerous videos from other social media users. Raye and Megan Thee Stallion are among the artists who have posted videos using the song. Because of the online trend, the song became increasingly popular. "Freaked Out" has been streamed more than 100 million times, and videos that use it have collectively received over seven billion views on YouTube.

As a result of the streams, "Freaked Out" debuted at No. 88 on the Billboard Hot 100. He was the first Kurdish artist and the second New Zealand rapper to place on the American music chart. (Note: A remix of "Swing", a track by the New Zealand rapper Savage, reached No. 45 on the Hot 100 in 2008.) In Australia, "Freaked Out" debuted at No. 42 on the ARIA Charts. In New Zealand, the song reached No. 1 on the Top 20 Aotearoa Singles Chart after debuting on the chart at No. 38. As a result of the song's success, Hussain and Omen signed to Warner Chappell Music for worldwide representation in August 2026. Later that month, Hussain and Omen were signed to the management roster of UNIFIED Music Group, an Australian company expanding to New Zealand. In early September 2026, Hussain and Omen released "ON MY MIND".

== Artistry ==
The Music's Tyler Jenke described Hussain's style as blending hip-hop and R&B, while Billboard called it "melodic rapping". His songs feature EDM beats and production, driven by synthesizers; the music style of Hussain and the producers he works with, including Omen, has been dubbed "synthclub". Hussain has credited his Kurdish New Zealander background as being a significant influence on his music, telling The Guardian that listening exclusively to Kurdish music growing up made him sensitive to different music styles. He also said that his inspirations include the American rapper Kid Ink and the producer Mustard, 2015 club music, and West Coast, New York and New Jersey hip-hop.
