= Brother Paul's Children's Mission =

Child sexual abuse ring from Michigan, U.S.

Brother Paul's Children's Mission was an organization identified in July 1976 as a front for a child pornography ring operating out of North Fox Island in Lake Michigan. It was incorporated on June 18, 1975, and was advertised as an organization which "provide[d] services to children with reading problems, minor emotional counseling, and classes in physical fitness". During paid sessions on the island, boys would be filmed engaging in sex acts with each other and adults, and were occasionally prostituted to the Mission's wealthiest customers.

Francis Shelden was the proprietor of North Fox Island, while Adam Starchild was the president of the Mission's parent company. Gerald Richards and Dyer Grossman were two other men involved in the Mission. The latter three were not convicted of sex crimes in the case—there was not sufficient evidence to charge Starchild, and the other two fled following Richards' arrest.

During a 1977 United States Senate subcommittee hearing, gay rights activist and sex offender Guy Strait testified that Richards was one of four major producers of child pornography in the 1970s. (Note: The other three being himself, Roy Ames, and a man named "Walter" operating in the New Jersey area.)

== North Fox Island and Shelden ==
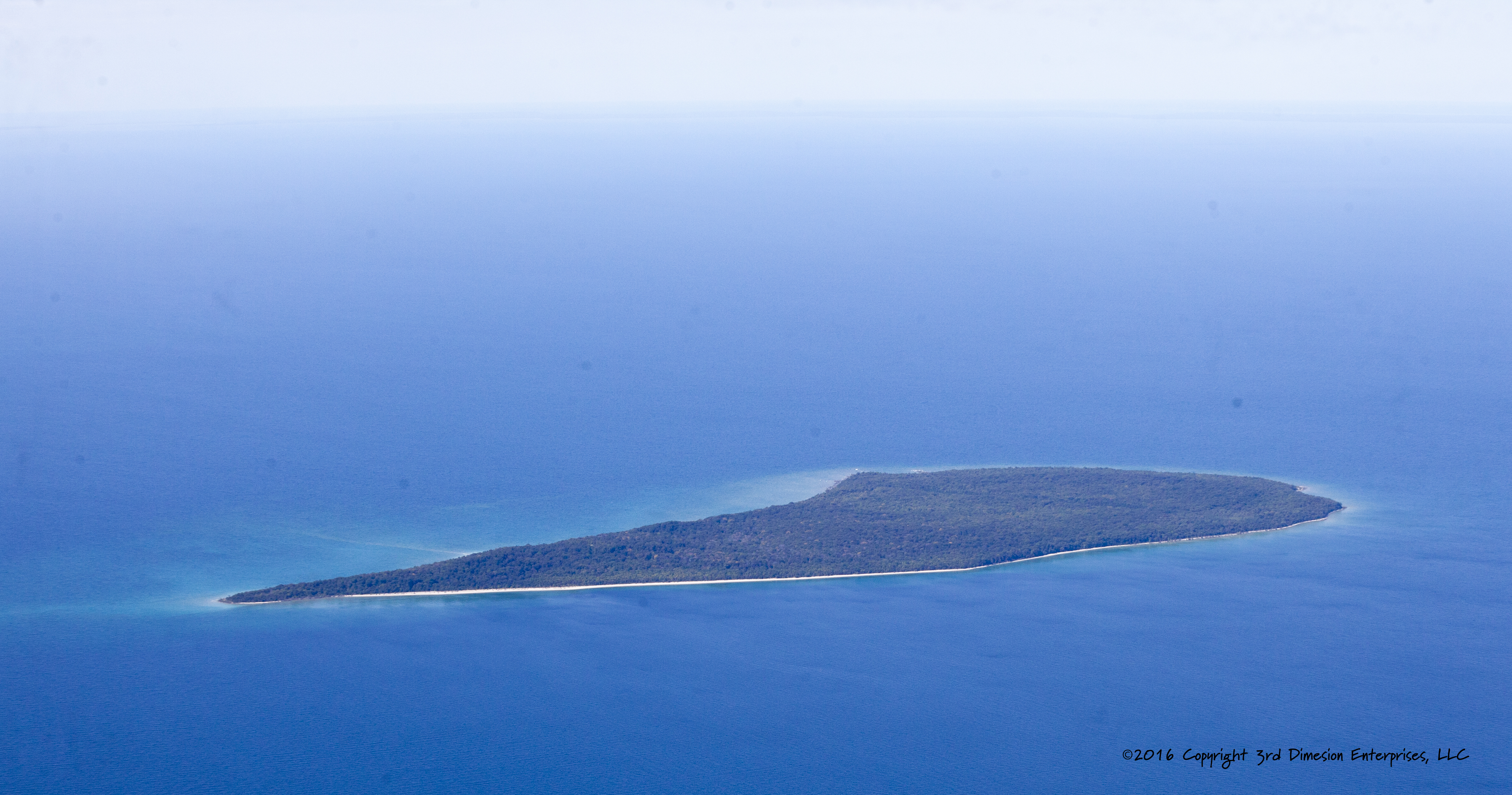
North Fox Island in 2016

According to a December 1975 feature story by the Detroit Free Press, Francis Duffield Shelden (1928–1996) and his brother purchased North Fox Island in 1960 for $20,000 from the widow of J. O. Plank, an investor from Northern Michigan. Shelden was noted as a "Big Brother" who flew adult friends and children to his retreat. He was also described as a former airman in the Air National Guard and a "private investor" who attended Yale University and obtained a master's degree in geology. J. Reuben Appelman claims in The Kill Jar that Shelden was something akin to an "executive" of the child pornography trade in Detroit throughout the 1960s and 1970s.

== Gerald Richards ==
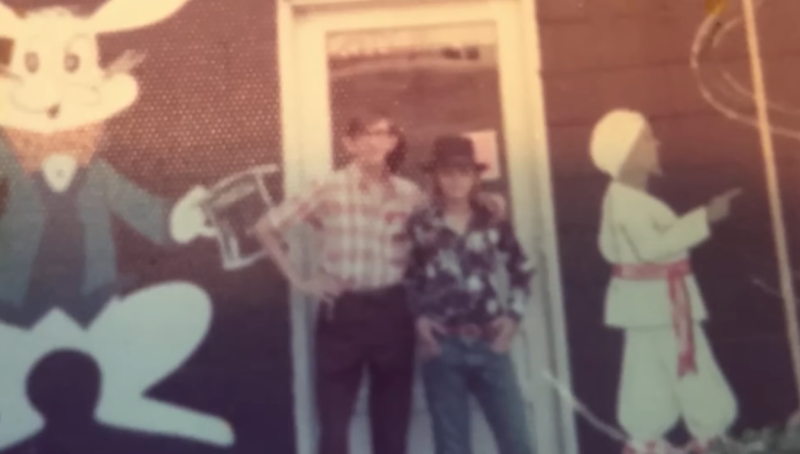
Richards during his time as a magician, c. 1967–1976

On July 25, 1976, Gerald Stewart Richards (1941–1994), a physical education teacher at St. Joseph's Catholic School in Port Huron, Michigan, was arrested on charges of child molestation. Suspicions had been raised when the mother of one of his students was made aware of inappropriate conduct by Richards, such as him holding and measuring students' penises under the pretense of determining their jockstrap size.

At the time of his arrest, Richards was married, had a young child, and was a self-described "master magician" who offered his services free of charge to churches and schools. Richards came from a locally respected family; his father was a police officer, and he had first learned how to use a camera by taking mug shots of criminals at his father's precinct.

While studying electronics and youth services at St. Clair County Community College in 1969, Richards began working at Satan Adult Bookstore; it was during this time that he began reselling prints of pornography and made contacts within the industry. After learning of how profitable it was, he left the store and began a mail-order child pornography business, recruiting dozens of local boys from troubled backgrounds. According to Richards, he had approximately six hundred customers, who preferred the youngest children he could access.

== Brother Paul's Children's Mission ==
In 1974, Richards was contacted by Francis Shelden through a coded classified ad in the boy-love magazine Better Life Monthly, pertaining to a "magic show" with a young apprentice. After some correspondence, the two met and began travelling together, often to Chicago, where they accessed boys through proprietors of porn shops and seedy motel owners. They would go on to establish "Brother Paul's Children's Mission", a tax-exempt charitable trust and alleged self-improvement group for troubled youths. (Note: Prior to "Brother Paul's Children's Mission", Richards and his wife were part-owners of "Brother Paul's Educational Entertainment Missions", a non-profit religious organization that focused on magic performances. While these were two separate organizations, they retained Richards' "Brother Paul" characterization. In 1970, another organization was operated by Richards under the name "Brother Paul's Ecumenical Missions".) Parents or guardians were charged $85 (equivalent to $481 in 2025) for a child's six-day stay at Shelden's North Fox Island. After being flown out via his Piper Seneca II, the boys were encouraged to be nude and engage in oral and anal sex on camera. Wealthy subscribers to their publication, which featured this material, were invited to the island to have sex with these boys.

As Richards and Shelden were focused on maximizing their income from the operation, plans were also drawn out to establish the Mission as a child welfare agency so that states and the federal government would subsidize them. In addition to the Mission, the "Ocean Living Institute" and the "Educational Foundation for Youth" were set up as tax shelters.

Purported to be involved in the operation was Dyer Grossman (b. 1941), a Carmel, New York, millionaire and science teacher at a prestigious all-boys boarding school. Grossman was listed as vice president of the Mission and was a close associate of Richards and Shelden. Also suspected was Adam Aristotle Starchild (1946–2006), a "perpetual traveler" and white-collar criminal. Starchild was listed as president of the "Church of the New Revelation", the Mission's parent company and publication offering help to readers of boy-love magazines on establishing child care organizations and camps. He was also listed in other leadership roles in the ring's network of tax dodges. Prior to the bust, Starchild claimed in an interview with Detroit that he was active in a Big Brothers-like organization sponsored by Ann Arbor's YMCA and that he took children on trips to North Fox.

=== Investigation ===
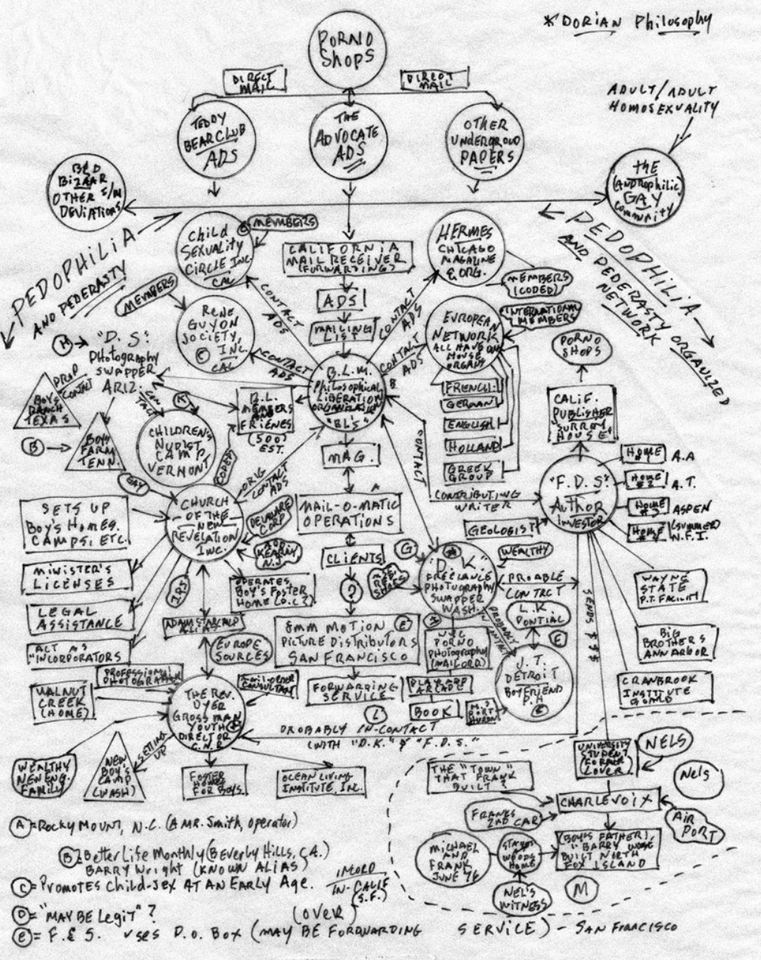
The "Dorian Philosophy"—a network diagram drawn by Richards during a 1977 U.S. Senate subcommittee hearing investigating the commercial sexual exploitation of children

After Richards' arrest, an investigation was carried out by the Michigan State Police. Detectives discovered large caches of child pornography in his car and office, some of which was in stamped envelopes in preparation to be mailed. Also found were lists of the names and addresses of customers, as well as contacts to other figures in the child pornography and prostitution business. As part of a plea deal, Richards gave law enforcement a great deal of information in regard to the operation they were running out of North Fox. He confessed that children were flown to the island to be filmed in child pornography, and that Grossman had helped form the Mission and participated in a child orgy with himself and Shelden at a Holiday Inn in Port Huron.

Three days after Richards was arrested, Shelden's home in Ann Arbor was raided by law enforcement; however, he was not present, and all of his cabinets and drawers had been emptied prior. The lead detective in the case attempted to get an arrest warrant for Shelden, which the prosecutor rejected, as they were "waiting to see if charges were going to be brought against [him] in St. Clair County". Concurrently, the prosecutor of St. Clair County was waiting until the investigation was completed before issuing an arrest warrant. After a warrant was obtained in December, it became apparent that Shelden had already fled the country after he was made aware by Richards' wife that he was arrested.

Grossman was charged with criminal sexual conduct for acts he committed against two underage boys; however, he had also fled before he could be arrested. Both Grossman and Shelden were declared fugitives and named on federal arrest warrants, after which the FBI joined the effort to locate them. It was believed that Grossman had fled to California, while Shelden fled to the Netherlands. At the time, the Netherlands and the U.S. did not share an extradition treaty.

After law enforcement across the country was notified of the front organizations, a roll of undeveloped film sent from a man in California to Richards was identified to be photographs from Claudius Vermilye's "Boys' Farm", a similar child pornography operation based in rural Tennessee. Shelden was listed as a sponsor of the Farm.

== Aftermath ==
Following news of what had occurred on the island, Michigan lawmakers and other officials tightened regulations and made efforts to increase DSS staff so that foster homes and children's camps could be supervised more closely.

Richards would plead guilty, and in September 1976, he was sentenced to two to twenty years in prison. Richards did not fare well during his imprisonment: he was assaulted and tortured by other inmates, attempted suicide via overdose, and made attempts to recover his image. In March 1977, he was interviewed by child welfare advocate Kenneth Wooden for a segment on 60 Minutes on the subject of child pornography. (Note: Richards did not appear in the final cut of the episode.) Richards expressed "sorrow and loss" for his involvement in the business. Later that year, a U.S. Senate subcommittee was investigating the commercial sexual exploitation of children, during which Richards testified about the functions of the trade and his motivations, sexual and financial. Richards was arrested again on child pornography charges in 1988 and died in 1994.

Shelden died in Amsterdam in 1996, having retained some of his wealth through a trust with Starchild until they had a falling out in the 1980s. Starchild died in Spain in 2006, having stood trial for several crimes, but none in relation to North Fox Island.

In August 2026, FBI director Kash Patel posted a video online which showed himself in Detroit standing in front of a wanted poster of Grossman. He is currently believed to be living in the Netherlands, and law enforcement is seeking to extradite him.

== O.C.C.K. murders ==
There has been persistent speculation that the crimes may have ties to the Oakland County Child Killer case, which involved the unsolved murders of four Michigan children in 1976–77. Former O.C.C.K. suspect Christopher Busch was a known client of Brother Paul's, and investigators also believe that the perpetrator of the Oakland County killings could have been someone who victimized children on North Fox.

== See also ==
- Sexual abuse scandal in New Orleans Boy Scout Troop 137
- John David Norman
- Catherine Stubblefield Wilson

== Cited works ==
- Keenan, Marney (2020). The Snow Killings: Inside the Oakland County Child Killer Investigation. Jefferson, North Carolina: Exposit. ISBN 1476684006.
- Linedecker, Clifford (1981). Children in Chains. New York City: Everest House. ISBN 0896960889.
