= Adam Starchild =

Financial consultant and fraudster (1946–2006)

- Born: Malcolm Willis McConahy; September 20, 1946; Minnesota, U.S.
- Died: September 22, 2006 (aged 60); Spain
- Occupations: Author; Business consultant
- Known for: Fraud

Adam Aristotle Starchild (born Malcolm Willis McConahy; September 20, 1946 – September 22, 2006) was an American-born financial consultant, author, and a convicted fraudster and sex offender. He was associated with the “perpetual traveler” movement and wrote extensively on "offshore finance," taxation, and international investment strategies.

Starchild was convicted of fraud-related offenses in the United States in the late 1960s and in both the United Kingdom and the United States in subsequent decades. He also had convictions in the United States involving the possession and distribution of sexual material concerning minors. He was removed from a leadership role in his youth following allegations of inappropriate conduct with minors, and was also linked in reporting to the North Fox Island scandal in the mid-1970s.

== Early life ==
Malcolm Willis McConahy was born in Minnesota on September 20, 1946. Little is known of his youth, but he later changed his name to Adam Aristotle Starchild, explaining on his website that Starchild was "a common Plains Cree name, found in usage across western Canada", indicating that he might have been of Native American descent. He claimed to be a former chairman of the Confederation of American Indians.

== Scouting ==
Between February and July 1965, McConahy was an assistant scout master with Troop 27 in Minneapolis, a troop sponsored by Plymouth Congregational Church of that city, but was suspended after admitting homosexual interest in boys in the troop. Scouting records state that his personal and family church relationship was with Joyce Methodist Church. At the time, he was operating a travel business in Minneapolis.

In July 1965, McConahy was arrested in Wisconsin for circulating pornographic material. He was traveling to New York to take up residence there and was in the company of four boys to whom he had given money.

In 1966, he moved to Milwaukee, where he applied in February to be a college reserve scouter. His application stated that he was studying at Blackstone School of Law, to graduate in December 1968. The application was rejected by the National Council of the Boy Scouts of America, who were aware of his scouting background in Minneapolis. In 1967, he was convicted of possessing obscene literature and contributing to the delinquency of a minor. In 1968 he was arrested for his involvement with a 16-year-old.

== First frauds ==
In 1968, McConahy was convicted for a $57,000 check fraud in which he tried to dupe ten different banks. He was running a travel agency, Creative Travel Inc., at the time. In January 1969, he was sentenced to one year and one day in jail on three counts of mail fraud but failed to appear to start his sentence in April that year, resulting in the issue of a warrant for his arrest.

He travelled to England around 1970, where he was arrested by police and subsequently served four years in jail for forgery. In 1970, the U.S. Securities & Exchange Commission placed securities thought to have been issued by McConahy on its Foreign Restricted List. These included "Bank Money Orders" in the name of J.P. Morgan & Company Ltd. of London (intended to be mistaken for the J.P. Morgan) in an amount exceeding $375,000, which had been mailed to 31 savings and loan associations in California and a bank in Minnesota in order to open new accounts against which withdrawals were then attempted, and documents labelled "Negotiable Certificate of Deposit", also of J.P. Morgan & Company Ltd. of London, which had been circulated in the United States. Advertisements had been placed in U.S. newspapers offering for sale joint venture interests by Swiss Caribbean Development & Finance Corporation of Zurich and certificates of deposit issued by Trust Company of Jamaica Ltd. After being released from prison in the U.K., McConahy was extradited to the United States, where he was arrested by U.S. Marshals in February 1974 after he stepped off the plane in New York. He was charged with unlawful flight and bail jumping and extradited to Wisconsin, where he was convicted and sentenced to an additional one-year and one-day in prison. He began his sentence in Sandstone, Minnesota, in May 1974 and was released in July that year.

In September 1974, he appeared in court in Trenton, N.J., asking to be declared indigent so that he would not have to pay fees required as part of the process of recovering the charters of three Panamanian mutual funds that had been seized by British police. He claimed their loss had cost him $855,000.

== Adam Starchild ==
Around 1975 or 1976, McConahy changed his name to Adam Aristotle Starchild. In February 1976, a photograph of him as Adam Starchild appeared in the gay newspaper The Advocate by that name. The paper reported that Starchild, an "openly gay business consultant" of West Hudson Business Service, Kearny, N.J., had received a Presidential Sports Award from Gerald Ford for his canoe expeditions through the Quetico-Superior wilderness area of Minnesota and Ontario.

On March 4, 1976, an obituary appeared in the Kearny Observer as follows:

Malcolm McConahy, of 325 Maple St., was killed in an auto accident in Minneapolis, Minn. while visiting relatives. McConahy was the sales manager for the West Hudson Business Service and recently opened his own consulting firm, McConahy Associates. He is survived by a brother in Tennessee.

In May 1976, he appeared in the Bergen County, New Jersey courthouse seeking dismissal of a lawsuit he had filed one year earlier against his mother.

Starchild's writing career began at about the same time as he changed his name. He was prolific, writing on topics that broadly reflected his libertarian, anti-tax, anti-government attitudes. He often used publishers who specialised in producing works of a similar nature, such as Loompanics Unlimited, Paladin Press and Scope International. Periods in the 1970s and 80s when he produced no books appear to tie-in with times when he was in prison.

In 1977, the Traverse City Record-Eagle reported that Starchild was involved in a number of supposed charitable organizations funded by a wealthy Michigander, Francis Duffield Shelden: the Church of the New Revelation of Kearny, New Jersey, Brother Paul's Children's Mission on North Fox Island, Michigan, the Educational Foundation for Youth of Illinois, and the Ocean Living Institute of New Jersey—the last allegedly devoted to underwater habitats, aquaculture, ocean architecture, and ocean law, which were said to be tax dodges and fronts for sexual activity involving boys.

In 1976, Shelden fled to the Netherlands to escape impending charges. To protect his assets, he handed two million dollars in securities to Starchild, who had advised the creation of an offshore trust with himself as trustee. However, Starchild neglected to provide proper accounting or hand over the securities to the successor trustee, Edward Brongersma, whom an increasingly worried Shelden appointed. Despite being an international fugitive, in 1983 Shelden managed to successfully take Starchild to court to reclaim the funds.

== 1980s ==
In 1980, Starchild was linked by the St. Petersburg Times to Richard Kelly's involvement in the Abscam scandal through Starchild's relationship with Kelly's aide, J.P. Maher III. According to Kelly, it was Maher who asked Starchild to handle a campaign mailing list through his firm, Minerva Consulting Group Inc.

In 1986, he was convicted of mail fraud, beginning his sentence on September 25, 1986. He was additionally convicted of tax fraud in 1989. While incarcerated at the Federal Correctional Institution, Ashland, Starchild won third prize in the essay section of the Prison Writing Awards 1990–1991 for his essay, Rape as Punishment. He also had an article published in the Journal of Psychohistory in 1990, titled "Rape of youth in prisons and juvenile facilities", in which he compared and contrasted prison rape in the United States, Britain, Latin America, South Africa, and Turkey, finding that the phenomenon often exhibited cultural differences by region and country.

== 1990s ==
In 1992, after his release from prison, Starchild appealed his parole conditions that he must live and work in the United States for approximately five years on the grounds, among others, that as a citizen of the Dominican Republic, he should have been allowed to return to his own country after the completion of his sentence. The Court of Appeals for the Eighth Circuit ruled in October 1992 that they did not have jurisdiction in the matter. It is unclear when Starchild became a citizen of the Dominican Republic or whether he ever gave up his American citizenship.

Starchild became active on the internet, posting in Usenet and being described in an academic journal in 1998 as "an offshore finance proselytizer who is prominent on the World Wide Web, [who] encourages investors to dispense with what he views as ancient, irrational, primordial sentiments and attachments, and instead to embrace a late capitalist nomadism he terms 'PT'".

In 1999, Starchild was living in Panama and sponsoring a university student in Guatemala. He was a client of Marc Harris's Panama-based Harris Organisation.

== Death ==
Starchild died in Spain on September 22, 2006. He had recently moved there from Panama as he felt that he would receive better medical care in Spain. Earlier in 2006, he had traveled to Japan for experimental surgery on a tumor and wrote that his operation there had attracted the attention of the Japanese media. Starchild was survived by his partner Javier.

== Memberships ==
Among the organizations of which Starchild claimed to be a member were the Libertarian Futurist Society, the International Society for Individual Liberty, Mensa, the National Space Society, The Lighter-Than-Air Society, the World Future Society, the Center for Entrepreneurial Management, the Extropy Institute, The Heinlein Society, the Academy of International Business, The Authors Guild (United States), and The Society of Authors (Great Britain). He was a member of the Hong Kong Chamber of Commerce.

== Selected publications ==
=== Books ===
==== 1970s ====
- Tax havens: what they are and how they work. North Arlington, N.J.: Financial Technology, 1975. OCLC 1512839
- It's your money: a consumer's guide to credit. New York: Books for Business, 1978. ISBN 0846705648
- Starchild & Holahan's seafood cookbook. Seattle: Pacific Search Press, 1978. ISBN 0914718347 (With James Holahan)
- How to develop and manage a successful condominium. Washington: Books for Business, 1979. ISBN 0894990063
- Investing in the US: resolving the legal, financing, regulatory and tax issues. London: Euromoney Publications, c. 1979. ISBN 0903121123
- Tax havens: what they are and what they can do for the shrewd investor. New Rochelle, N.Y.: Arlington House, 1979. ISBN 0870004549
- Tax havens for corporations. Houston: Gulf Publishing Company, 1979. ISBN 0872018180

==== 1980s ====
- Everyman's guide to tax havens. Boulder, Colorado: Paladin Press, 1980. ISBN 0873642031
- Building wealth: a layman's guide to trust planning. New York: AMACOM, 1981. ISBN 0814456863
- Start your own construction and land development business. Chicago: Nelson-Hall, 1983. ISBN 0830410139
- Tax planning for foreign investors in the United States. Deventer, Netherlands: Kluwer, 1983. ISBN 9065441093
- The seafood heritage cookbook. Centreville, Md.: Tidewater Publishers, 1984. ISBN 0870333127

==== 1990s ====
- Business in 1990: A Look to the Future. United States: Books on Demand, c. 1990. ISBN 0835754952
- Marketing computer hardware and software in Latin America and the Caribbean. New York: Books for Business, 1992. OCLC 30547472
- How to legally hide your money in Switzerland. Eden Press, 1993. OCLC 31991825
- Second passports and dual nationality. Baltimore: Agora Inc., 1993. ISBN 0991722930
- Swiss money strategies. Baltimore: Oxford Club, 1993. OCLC 30894838
- The tax haven report: how to internationalize your capital for protection and profit. Waterlooville: Scope International, 1993. ISBN 0906619394
- Wealth angles. Baltimore: Caer Laer, 1993. ISBN 0945332378
- Fortress Switzerland: the global gateway to your offshore nestegg. Zurich: CityDruck Offset, 1994. OCLC 34284944
- How to immigrate to the US. Waterlooville: Scope International, 1994. ISBN 0906619432
- Reviving the American dream: stop "just getting by" and build real wealth. Boulder: Paladin Press, 1994. ISBN 0873647971
- Tax havens for international business. Houndmills, Basingstoke: Macmillan, 1994. ISBN 0333604857
- The complete guide to global inve$ting. Washington, D.C.: Oxford Club, 1994. OCLC 31780204
- The offshore money manual: how to send your money overseas swiftly, privately, and profitably. Baltimore, MD: Oxford Club, 1994. OCLC 31001566
- Using offshore havens for privacy and profits. Boulder, Colo.: Paladin Press, 1994. ISBN 087364767X
- Using Switzerland for asset protection. Rowlands Castle: Scope International, 1994. OCLC 49052565
- How to legally obtain a second citizenship and passport and why you would want to. Port Townsend, Washington: Loompanics Unlimited, 1995. ISBN 1559501111
- Keep what you own: protect your money, property, and family from courts, creditors, and the IRS. Boulder: Paladin Press, 1995. ISBN 087364834X
- The offshore solution. Manchester, NH: Center for Business Information, 1995. OCLC 34068197
- Tax havens for Canadians: ingenious ways to preserve your wealth (and have fun doing it). Toronto: Productive Publications, 1995. ISBN 189621018X
- The offshore entrepreneur: profit & opportunity have no borders. Dalton, Georgia: First Street Press, 1995. ISBN 0964811502
- Protect your assets: how to avoid falling victim to the government's forfeiture laws. Boulder: Paladin Press, 1996. ISBN 0873649060
- Swiss money secrets: how you can legally hide your money in Switzerland. Boulder: Paladin Press, 1996. ISBN 0873648552
- The wealth report: capital preservation through global investing. Rowlands Castle, Hants.: Scope International, 1996. ISBN 0906619564
- The business havens report. Rowlands Castle: Scope International, 1997. ISBN 0906619599
- The New Zealand immigration guide. Port Townsend, Washington: Loompanics Unlimited, 1997. ISBN 1559501545
- Portable wealth: the complete guide to precious metals investment. Boulder: Paladin Press, 1998. ISBN 0873649591

==== 2000s ====
- Cayman Islands business laws. London: International Law & Taxation Publishers, 2000. ISBN 1893713024
- History of the income tax. London: International Law & Taxation Pub., 2000. ISBN 1893713415
- Start your own travel agency. New York: Books for Business, 2000. ISBN 0894992368
- The complete guide to tax havens: how to internationalize your capital for protection and profits. London: International Law and Taxation Publishers, 2000. ISBN 1893713105
- The conservative wealthbuilder: capital preservation through global investing. New York, N.Y.: Books for Business, 2000. ISBN 0894990500
- The marketing dictionary. London: International Law & Taxation Publishers, 2000. ISBN 1893713156
- How to save on your taxes without cheating. New York: Books for Business, 2001. ISBN 0894990292
- Think like an entrepreneur: winning the money game. New York: Books for Business, 2001. ISBN 0894992414
- Understanding global capitalism: the entrepreneur's guide to wealth creation. New York: Books for Business, 2001. ISBN 0894990012
- Worldwide opportunities in travel and tourism. New York: Books for Business, 2001. ISBN 089499235X
- The ocean frontier. Honolulu: University Press of the Pacific, 2002. ISBN 1410202879
- The charitable remainder trust: reduce estate and income taxes through charitable giving. New York: Books for Business, 2005. ISBN 0894992430.
- The complete tax haven guide: financial freedom through global investing. New York: Books for Business, 2005. ISBN 0894992449
- The family emergency manual. Amsterdam: Fredonia Books, 2006. ISBN 1410108929

=== Articles ===
- "Holland and the Tax Haven Company". International Business Lawyer, Vol. 10 (xi), 1982
- "How the post office was nationalised". Economic Affairs, v. 12, n. 2 (February 1992): 23.
- "Rape of youth in prisons and juvenile facilities". Journal of Psychohistory, Vol 18. (2), 1990, 145–150.

=== Edited works ===
- The Science Fiction of Konstantin Tsiolkovsky. Forest Grove, Oregon: University Press of the Pacific, 2000. ISBN 0898750059

== See also ==
- Brother Paul's Children's Mission
- Claudius Vermilye
- Edward Brongersma
- Frank Abagnale
- John David Norman
- Marc Harris
- North Fox Island
