= Phillip Paske =

American criminal and child pornographer (1953–1998)

- 1987 mug shot of Paske
- Born: Phillip Ronald Paske; June 11, 1953; Chicago, Illinois, U.S.
- Died: November 9, 1998 (aged 45); Chicago, Illinois, U.S.
- Organization: Delta Project

Details
- Span of crimes: c. 1976 – 1979 (with Norman)
- Country: United States
- State: Illinois

Phillip Ronald Paske (Note: Sometimes spelled as Philip) (June 11, 1953 – November 9, 1998) was an American criminal and child pornographer from Chicago, Illinois. In the mid-1970s, he was the closest associate of sex trafficker John David Norman and was briefly an employee of serial killer John Wayne Gacy.

== Biography ==
Paske was born on June 11, 1953, in Chicago, Illinois. It was reported that his father worked for the city's 33rd ward and that Paske had a violent temper and frequently cross-dressed. Paske was also openly bisexual and had a lengthy criminal record beginning at age 17 in 1971, with convictions for drug dealing, theft, battery, and murder.

In a 1992 prison interview with John Wayne Gacy, who once employed Paske, he described Paske as dangerous and stated that he used hard drugs, shared an apartment with a prostitute, and "pimp[ed] girls, boys, for sex or movies".

== 1973 robbery-murder ==
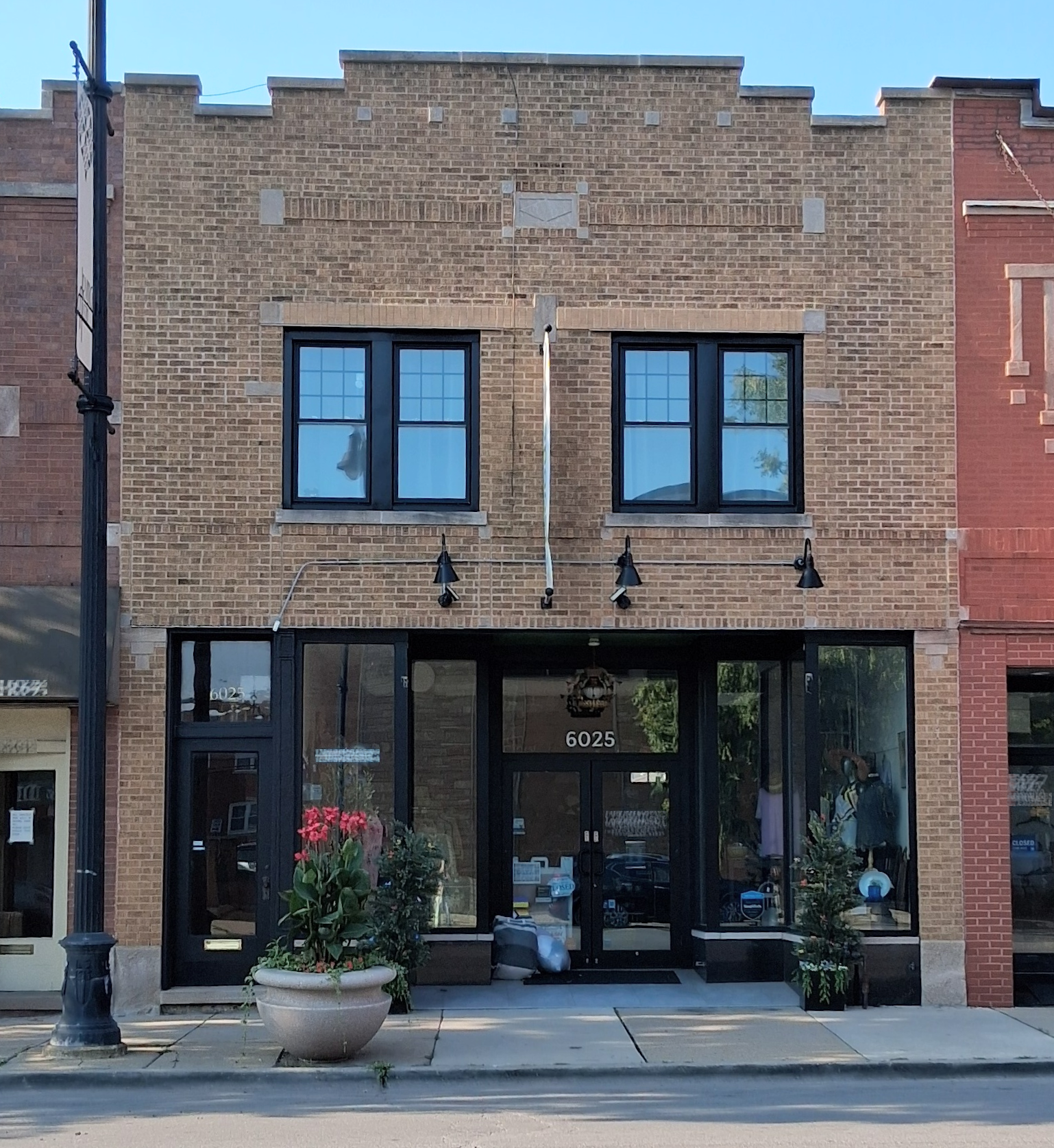
Location of the murder of Louis McKerley (pictured in 2026)

On November 7, 1973, Paske, along with Alfred Bone, 20, and Richard Angel, 18, planned to rob 65-year-old coin collector Louis McKerley. The attempted robbery took place at 7 p.m. in a second-floor apartment at 6025 W. Irving Park Road in Chicago, where McKerley was home watching television with his wife. Bone was armed with a knife, and Angel had accompanied him with a handgun. Paske's role was to act as a lookout for any oncoming witnesses. When McKerley opened the door, Bone and Angel asked whether he had any coins for sale before forcing their way into the apartment. A struggle ensued, and Bone stabbed McKerley in the chest. All three then fled the scene after McKerley's wife began to scream. McKerley would later succumb to his stab wounds. The three were arrested and charged with murder and attempted armed robbery.

Through a plea deal, Paske and Angel's murder charges were dropped; in exchange, they pleaded guilty to attempted armed robbery. Both served prison time and afterward were placed on probation. Bone would subsequently plead guilty and receive a sentence of 14 to 20 years imprisonment.

== Child pornography ring ==
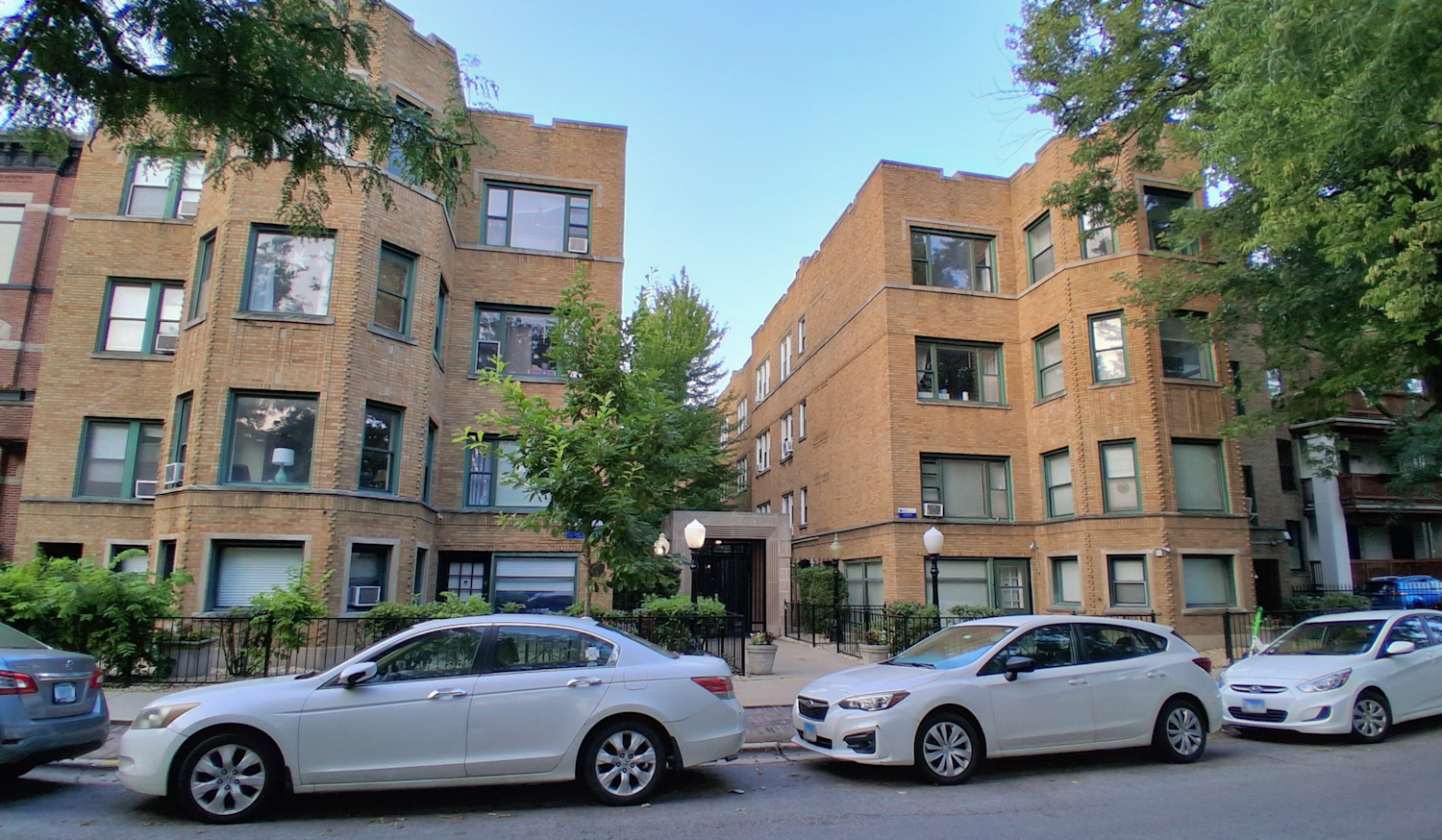
685 1/2 W. Wrightwood Ave. in Chicago. Paske was present when Norman was arrested in his apartment here in June 1978.

John David Norman (1927–2011) was a sex offender who ran multiple child pornography and prostitution rings in the 1970s and 1980s. As of 1977 his magazine Hermes had about 5,000 nationwide subscribers. He also had potential links to serial killers Dean Corll and John Wayne Gacy. According to Gacy, Norman produced snuff films of young boys; however, no such films have been found to exist. In 1973, the Commander of the Police Youth Division in Houston, Bennie M. Newman, stated that there was no known connection between Norman's operations and Corll's murders.

Norman and Paske first met in Chicago's Cook County Jail in late 1973. It is known that Norman had produced a newsletter (titled John Norman's Newsletter) behind the walls of the jail, in which he made pleas for bail for both him and for Paske, whom he referred to as his "right-hand man".

Paske was released on probation in 1976, after serving time for the McKerley case. The funds for bail came from patrons of Norman's newsletter. Subsequently, a patron from California paid Norman's bail. Norman remained free until November 1976, when he was indicted on five counts; he was found guilty of contributing to the sexual delinquency of a child and ordered to serve four years and one day.

After his release, Paske registered both his and Norman's names to a Chicago post office box, and the two shared an apartment on Wrightwood Avenue. The apartment also functioned as the base of operations for Norman's Delta Project, a sex trafficking ring involving teenage boys. On his probation record, it is stated in both May and December 1976 that Paske was working for Norman and was earning $3 an hour.

In January 1977, a month after Norman's conviction and arrest for sexual delinquency of a child, an investigator stated that the Delta Project was no longer operating in Chicago, though it had continued operations until a 1979 raid on Norman's apartment.

Paske was fired from his job as children's supervisor at a fire department swimming pool in August 1977 after he was publicly linked to Norman's child prostitution ring.

== Ties to John Wayne Gacy ==
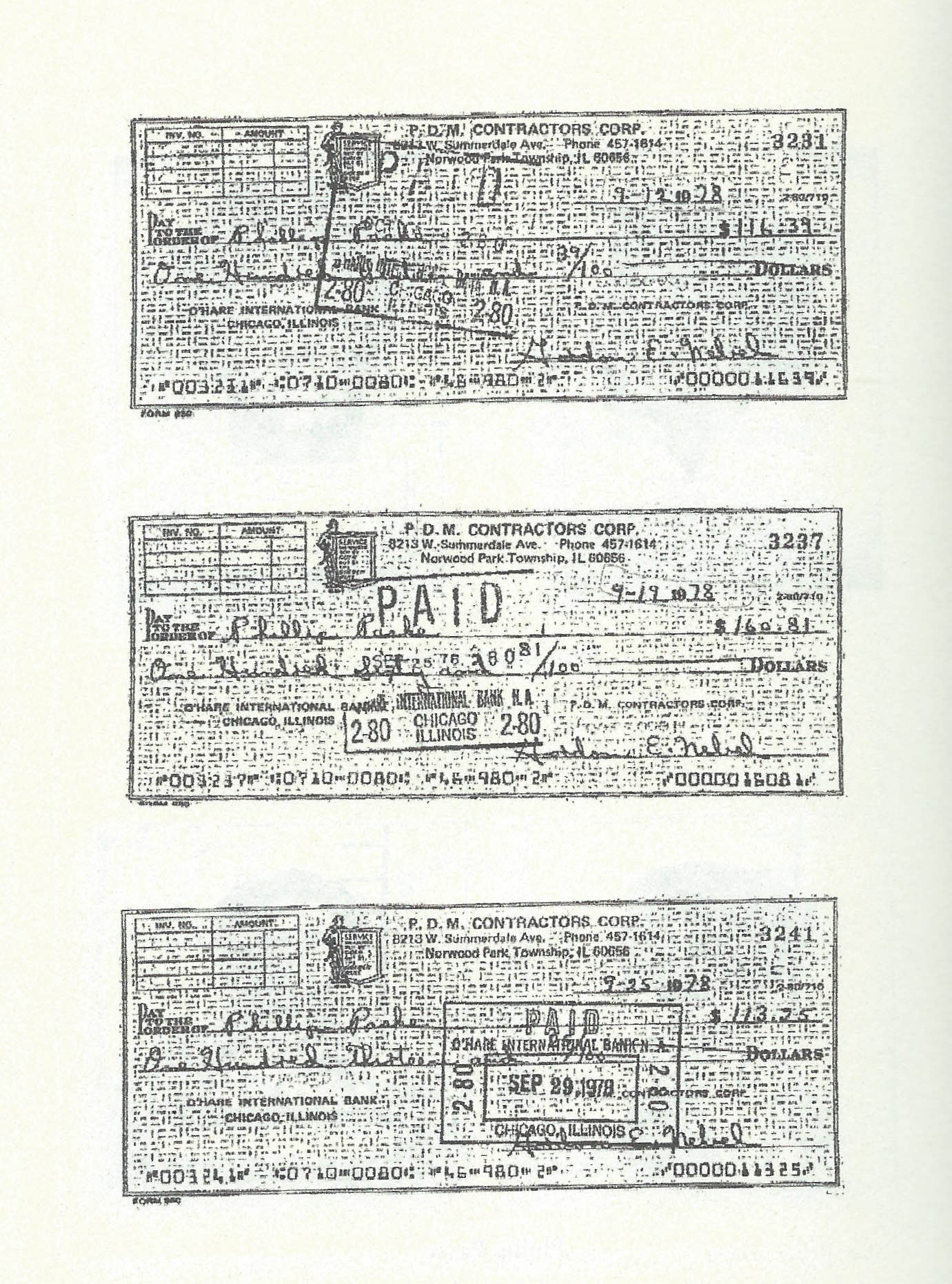
Pay stubs from Paske's employment under John Wayne Gacy, September 1978

The earliest record of Paske working for Gacy's construction business, PDM Contractors, is from 1978, when Paske had assisted in demolition work at a drugstore in Rochelle. Gacy was introduced to Paske through PDM employee David Cram, who was friendly with Paske. However, Cram claimed that he had warned Gacy about hiring Paske due to his criminal record and him having previously been in a mental institution.

Although there is no concise date for when Paske first came into contact with Gacy, he was using Gacy's alias "Patches" for himself after his 1976 release from prison. This alias was also used by fellow PDM employee Michael Rossi.

Both Rossi and Cram were named by Gacy as accomplices in several of his murders. Gacy contended that Rossi, Cram, and Paske all had keys to his house. It was also reported by Gacy that Paske was fired from his employment under PDM.

In Gacy's 1979 trial, Paske was listed on the state of Illinois' witness list and the defense's second supplemental list.

== Unrelated murders ==
Paske was initially wanted for questioning in the January 19, 1977, murder of Kenneth Hellstrom, 17, of Homewood. He was stabbed six times while walking home from work and died several hours later. Hellstrom had implicated Norman on child molestation charges in 1973, which resulted in Norman being sent to prison for four years. Norman was still in prison at the time of the murder. In June 2012, a man named Fred Rogers was convicted of Hellstrom's murder and sentenced to 22 years in prison. Rogers, who was 16 at the time, had gotten into an argument with Hellstrom earlier in the day that he was stabbed.

On February 25, 1979, Michael Salcido, 17, Arthur Salcido, 19, and Frank Mussa, 16, were found dead in a car at 3 a.m. in Chicago. Their throats were slashed in what police described as an "almost ritualistic" fashion. It was suspected that their bodies were placed in the car after their deaths. Michael was a ward of the state who was set to testify in Norman's upcoming trial. It was later revealed that Latin Kings members, of no relation to Norman or Paske, were responsible for the murders.

== Later life and death ==
Norman relocated to Pennsylvania in 1983 after his release from prison. Paske remained in Chicago, having occasional scrapes with the law; his final arrest was in 1996 for possession of a controlled substance. He died on November 9, 1998, in Chicago from AIDS-related complications.

== In media ==
- Devil in Disguise: John Wayne Gacy, E7 "David" (2025), played by Brandon McEwan

== Cited works ==
- Conti, Karen (2024). Killing Time With John Wayne Gacy. Black Lyon Publishing LLC. ISBN 979-8-986-51247-1.
- Dorsch, William (2023). Omnipotent: Don't Ask, Don't Tell. ISBN 9798988972914.
- Linedecker, Clifford (1981). Children in Chains. New York City: Everest House. ISBN 0896960889.
- Nelson, David (2021). Boys Enter the House: The Victims of John Wayne Gacy and the Lives They Left Behind. Chicago Review Press. ISBN 978-1-641-60486-4.
- Sullivan, Terry; Maiken, Peter (2000). Killer Clown: The John Wayne Gacy Murders (Paperback ed.). New York City: Pinnacle. ISBN 0-7860-1422-9. OCLC 156783287.
