= John David Norman =

American pedophile and sex offender (1927–2011)

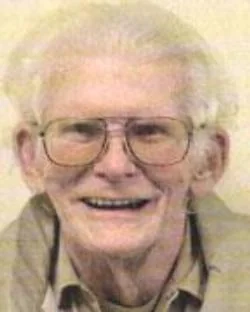
- Norman, c. 2008
- Born: October 13, 1927; Ada, Oklahoma, U.S.
- Died: May 22, 2011 (aged 83); Coalinga, California, U.S.
- Other name: List: Alan Hitchcock; Charles Caldwell; Clarence McKay; Doug White; John Paul Norman; John Shanks; Matthew Martinez; Patrick Nelson; Stephen Furwell; Steven Gurwell
- Organization(s): Odyssey Foundation; Delta Project; Handy Andy
- Spouse: Barbara Jean Lonsford (m. 1952; div. 1953)
- Status: Deceased

Details
- Victims: 31+
- Span of crimes: 1954–2009
- Country: United States
- States: California; Colorado; Illinois; Missouri; Pennsylvania; Texas

John David Norman (October 13, 1927 – May 22, 2011) was an American pedophile and sex offender convicted numerous times between 1960 and 1998 on charges of child molestation and child pornography. Throughout his life, Norman operated various direct mailing services dedicated to distributing child sexual abuse material and arranging sex trafficking. Among these operations were the Odyssey Foundation based in Dallas; the Delta Project, Creative Corps, and M-C Publications of Chicago; and Handy Andy from Pennsylvania.

Norman is known for his alleged links to serial killers Dean Corll and John Wayne Gacy, the latter via Norman's associate Phillip Paske. He used at least twenty aliases in his life. Norman's final conviction on child sexual abuse material charges was in 1998. Save for a brief period of supervised release from October 2008 to March 2009, he spent the rest of his life in state custody. Norman died in 2011, at age 83.

== Early life ==
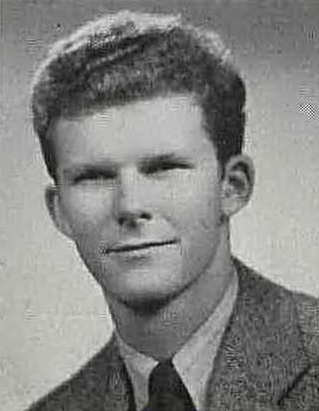
Norman at Northwestern University in Evanston, Illinois, 1947

John David Norman was born in Ada, Oklahoma, on October 13, 1927. A 1939 newspaper profile in The Ada Evening News described eleven-year-old Norman as a top-performing student, a skilled pianist, and a Cub Scout who enjoyed the outdoors. In 1943, when he was aged 16, Norman moved with his family to Houston, Texas, where he worked as a broadcast engineer for radio station KTRH. During this time, he hosted a program titled Experiment in Radio.

Norman attended Houston's Lamar High School and was a part of the student council and the National Honor Society in his junior year. While attending Lamar, he received a college scholarship from the Houston Committee of Constitutional Government. Enrolling at Northwestern University, where he was awarded a scholarship by station WIND in Chicago. From 1946 to the 1950s, Norman wrote commercial jingles for hundreds of products. In 1957, he distributed an album for Harry Oliver's Desert Rat Scrap Book.

== Crimes ==
=== Early crimes ===
Norman's criminal record dates back to the 1950s, when he was twice arrested for sexual assault in Houston in 1954 and 1956, though it is unknown if he was convicted of any crime in these cases. Court records and news reports indicate he was first convicted of sex crimes in 1960. Norman was convicted of sexual assault in California in 1963 and in federal court in 1970 for sending obscene literature through the mail. He received a fifteen-month prison sentence for the federal charge and served time at the McNeil Island Federal Penitentiary in Washington State.

=== Dallas: Odyssey Foundation ===
Logo of the Odyssey Foundation

On August 13, 1973, the Dallas Police Department received a memo from the FBI stating that they had talked to a 21-year-old named Charles Brisendine, who contacted the agency on the advice of Rob Shivers, the Dallas correspondent of the gay magazine The Advocate. Brisendine told agents that he had been invited to Dallas as a "fellow" by a "sponsor" of an organization called the Odyssey Foundation.

Presenting itself as a support group for gay men, the Odyssey Foundation approached and groomed male youths at bus stations. These boys and young men (referred to as "fellows") were photographed for the organization's booklets and trafficked to clients (referred to as "sponsors") who paid for their "company". The "fellows" were trafficked across the country, staying with "sponsors" for one to three days on average before traveling to the next "sponsor". Upon arriving in Dallas, Brisendine discovered that his "sponsor" was Norman, with whom he had a one-night stand at Norman's apartment. However, Brisendine gradually realized that Norman was illicitly preying upon young men for procurement into prostitution. When he looked through Norman's files, Brisendine found that several of the other "fellows" were listed as missing persons and had the word "kill" stamped on their files.

Brisendine suspected that Norman was connected to the recently uncovered serial murders committed by Dean Corll in Houston. Norman allegedly became agitated when the murders were mentioned over the phone. While Shivers and the FBI both believed that the "kill" files were meant to be disposed of as trash, Dallas police raided Norman's apartment at 3716 Cole Avenue due to the possible connection to the Corll case. Booklets were seized containing the photographs and contact information of teenage boys and young men, as well as 30,000 index cards listing between 50,000 and 100,000 clients located in thirty-five U.S. states.

Lt. Harold Hancock of the Dallas police told the Chicago Tribune in May 1977 that prominent public figures and federal employees were among the names found in Norman's client list. A review by the Dallas police found that two names included in the index cards matched that of U.S. State Department employees, however no investigation against them was ever initiated. The Dallas Police Department turned over the 30,000 index cards to the State Department on suspicion of the passport fraud of a juvenile. All 30,000 index cards were destroyed after no passport fraud was found. Norman was charged with possessing marijuana, conspiracy to commit sodomy, and contributing to the delinquency of a juvenile; he was released on bail.

=== Illinois: Delta Project ===
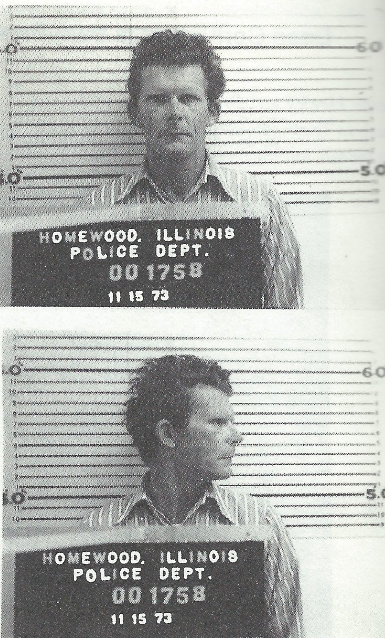
Mug shot of Norman in 1973

After being released in Dallas, Norman fled to Homewood, Illinois, a suburb of Chicago, in late August or early September 1973. Using the name Steve Gurwell, he began living with Charles Rehling, an Odyssey Foundation client from Homewood. Norman had previously trafficked a sixteen-year-old boy from Independence, Missouri, to Rehling, who went on a trip to Europe with the boy.

During his time in Homewood, Norman sexually abused ten teenage boys, enticing them with beer, showing them pornography and committing acts such as groping and oral sex upon them. On October 31, 1973, Homewood police received an anonymous call stating that Norman was sexually abusing boys. Norman was out of town at the time, but police were able to locate Rehling, who assisted them in their investigation. Upon his return to Homewood on November 14, Norman was arrested and charged with eight counts of indecent liberties with a child and eight counts of contributing to the delinquency of a minor.

In the spring of 1976, while still awaiting trial on charges related to the Homewood offenses, Norman was bailed out of Cook County Jail for $36,000 by an unknown person from California. Shortly before his release, Norman began his next operation, the Delta Project, and began publishing a newsletter called Hermes. Using the jail's printing press, Norman sent out three issues of John Norman's Newsletter, claiming that the Delta Project aimed to "provide educational, travel and self-development opportunities for qualified young men of character and integrity" and that "Delta-Dorms" were being established across the U.S., with each dorm having two to four "cadets" overseen by a "don". Police alleged that the "cadets" were underage male prostitutes recruited in Chicago. In a May 1977 interview with the Chicago Tribune, Norman denied that the Delta Project was sexual in nature and claimed to have sent the newsletter to over 7,000 people. At the time of the interview, police said that the newsletter had 5,000 subscribers and grossed over $300,000 per year. Norman's self-described "right-hand man" in the Delta Project's operations was Phillip Paske, whom Norman had met in prison in 1973.

In December 1976, Norman was sentenced to four years in prison for the Homewood offenses and sent to Pontiac Correctional Center. He was paroled in the fall of 1977, but was arrested again in Chicago in June 1978 for having sex with two underage boys from a local foster home and taking pornographic pictures of both. One of the boys informed investigators that Norman was in the process of selling him to a client and he (Norman) was simply "waiting for [his] plane ticket". Norman was accused of re-founding the Delta Project, now called the Creative Corps and M-C Publications, and operating it out of his apartment on West Wrightwood Avenue, allegedly sending photos of the boys to a "don" in Canada. In a raid of the apartment, 20,000 pink index cards (or possibly 50,000 to 100,000) containing the names of customers were found.

=== Pennsylvania: Handy Andy ===
Between October 1983 and May 1984, Norman produced and published a child pornography magazine called Handy Andy from his rural home and a nearby motel in Aspers, Pennsylvania. He exploited at least twenty teenage boys from the area, enticing them with drugs and alcohol and photographing them engaged in various sex acts. Norman fled Pennsylvania after his home was raided on May 31, 1984, but was captured in Bolingbrook, Illinois, in October 1984. He was released on bail in March 1985 and promptly fled again. Norman was captured for a final time in Urbana, Illinois, in August 1987, and given a six-year prison sentence for crimes in Illinois. He was later extradited to Pennsylvania and sentenced to eighteen to thirty-six months in prison for charges related to Handy Andy. A 1986 news report focusing on Handy Andy stated that Norman was wanted in five different states for child sex crimes.

=== Later crimes and commitment ===
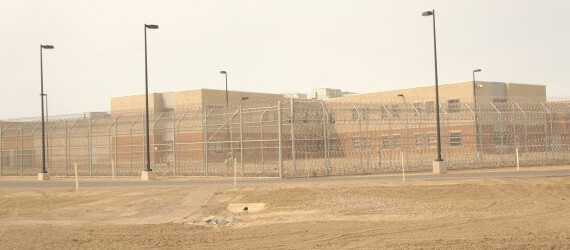
Coalinga State Hospital in California, where Norman spent the final two years of his life

Norman was convicted of child molestation in Colorado in 1988 and of distributing child pornography in California in 1995 and 1998. He was released from prison in California in 1999 but was declared a sexually violent predator and was detained indefinitely at Atascadero State Hospital. His psychiatrist, Dr. James Reavis, said about Norman: "John is an unrepentant adult male sex offender who in my opinion will go to his grave without any remorse for what he has done." He was eventually released from Atascadero to the rural town of Boulevard, California, under strict conditions. On February 2, 2009, Norman violated those conditions by giving a suggestive note containing his contact information to a 19-year-old grocery bagger in El Centro. In March 2009, he was ordered back into state custody, this time at Coalinga State Hospital, where he died in 2011.

== Possible connection to Dean Corll ==
Following Norman's 1973 arrest in Dallas, news reports indicated police were investigating if he had any ties to serial killer Dean Corll, who had murdered at least 29 teenage boys and young men in the Houston area between 1970 and 1973. Corll was himself killed on August 8, 1973, by his accomplice Elmer Wayne Henley, just days before Norman's arrest. Norman had previously lived in Houston, as evidenced by his 1954 and 1956 arrests there. Additionally, a source who tipped off police about the Odyssey Foundation was a male prostitute involved in the organization who became scared after an unidentified man in Houston requested his services.

Henley gave a statement to police following Corll's death in which he stated that Corll claimed to be involved with a Dallas-based organization that "bought and sold boys, ran whores and dope and stuff like that". Police stated they did not think Corll's other accomplice, David Owen Brooks, was involved with the Odyssey Foundation, but also did not rule out Corll and Henley as being involved, though they stated they had no evidence establishing any connection. In 1975, however, the Houston Police Department reported finding pictures depicting eleven of Corll's victims during a raid on a child prostitution ring, once again raising the possibility of connections to Norman.

== Possible connection to John Wayne Gacy ==
Norman is also alleged to have been connected to another serial killer, John Wayne Gacy, who murdered at least 33 teenage boys and young men in Chicago between 1972 and 1978. Norman's closest associate, Phillip Paske, was briefly an employee of Gacy's construction business, PDM Contractors. Police alleged that Paske had taken over running the Delta Project after Norman was sent to prison. Paske was also at Norman's apartment during his 1978 arrest, though Paske himself was not arrested.

Gacy implicated Paske, Norman, and two other PDM employees as his accomplices in murder. He described Paske as dangerous and stated that he "pimped girls, boys, for sex or movies". In a 1992 interview, Gacy claimed Norman and the Delta Project were producing snuff films of young boys, possibly including some of Gacy's victims.

== See also ==
- Brother Paul's Children's Mission
- Catherine Stubblefield Wilson
- Claudius Vermilye
- Roy Ames
- Sexual abuse scandal in New Orleans Boy Scout Troop 137

== Cited works ==
- Linedecker, Clifford (1981). Children in Chains. New York City: Everest House. ISBN 0896960889.
