= Alto, Tennessee =

Unincorporated community in Tennessee, U.S.

- Unincorporated community
- Location within the state of Tennessee
- Coordinates: 35°16′14.29″N 85°57′10.93″W
- Country: United States
- State: Tennessee
- County: Franklin
- Elevation: 1,017 ft (310 m)
- Time zone: UTC-6 (Central (CST))
  - Summer (DST): UTC-5 (CDT)
- ZIP Code: 37324
- Area code: 931
- GNIS feature ID: 1304815

Alto is an unincorporated community in Franklin County, Tennessee, United States. Its elevation is 1,017 feet (310 m). Alto is located near U.S. Route 64.

The Saint Margaret Mary Catholic Mission, a Gothic Revival chapel constructed in Alto in 1938, was listed on the National Register of Historic Places in 2017.

== Notable people ==
- Claudius Vermilye (1928–2018), defrocked priest and child pornographer
- Craig Anderson (1942–2026), formerly priest-in-charge at Christ Church in Alto
