= Claudius Vermilye =

American sex offender (1928–2018)

- Vermilye in or before 1976
- Born: Claudius Ira Vermilye III; December 11, 1928; New York City, U.S.
- Died: June 22, 2018 (aged 89); Kill Devil Hills, North Carolina, U.S.
- Other name: Father Bud
- Education: Tusculum University; The University of the South
- Occupation: Priest
- Children: 5
- Convictions: Crimes against nature (3 counts); Aiding and abetting crimes against nature (5 counts)
- Penalty: 25–40 years imprisonment

Details
- Span of crimes: 1971–1976
- Country: United States
- State: Tennessee
- Date apprehended: November 10, 1976

Claudius Ira Vermilye III (December 11, 1928 – June 22, 2018) was an American defrocked Episcopal priest and child pornographer who operated the "Boys' Farm" in rural Franklin County, Tennessee, between 1971 and 1976.

== Biography ==
Claudius Vermilye was born in 1928 and raised in Bayside, Queens, New York City. He graduated from Bayside High School and attended the local All Saints Episcopal Church. During the Korean War, Vermilye served in the Air Force for four years as a staff sergeant at Clark Air Base in the Philippines. After the war, he moved to Tennessee and graduated from Tusculum University in 1955 with a Bachelor of Arts degree. He further obtained a Master of Divinity from The University of the South's School of Theology in 1958. Later that year, he was ordained as a priest and served the Episcopal Diocese of Tennessee.

Vermilye had also established himself as a pastor of the St. Anne's Church Episcopal Church in Tifton, Georgia, where he worked within St. Anne's Home for Boys, caring for disadvantaged and homeless youths. In 1966, he was accused of attempting to seduce one of the boys in the home. A young man in the congregation also complained that he was subjected to "sexual overtures" by Vermilye. Vermilye proceeded to resign to avoid an investigation by the church.

Following his resignation, he moved to Augusta, Georgia, where he worked as a chaplain for the State Youth Development Center, counseling troubled boys as well as providing advice to parents.

In 1971, he requested and was granted reinstatement as a clergyman by Georgia's diocese. He then moved to Alto, Tennessee, as vicar of Christ Church. Though licensed and located in Tennessee, he continued to be responsible to the Bishop of the Diocese in Georgia.

That same year, he opened the 1 1/2-acre Boys' Farm of Roarks Cove in Alto, marketed as a rehabilitation center for homeless and wayward youths—a place where "boys could learn self-respect and responsibility". Troubled adolescents were placed into his custody by courts, welfare agencies, and, in some cases, their parents. The Boys' Farm was not church-sponsored and was funded largely by its clientele.

== Boys' Farm ==
During his tenure as director of the Boys' Farm, Vermilye sexually abused his wards, aged 11 to 16, and photographed them engaging in sexual acts amongst each other. The photographs were developed in a darkroom located in his attic and were mailed to customers in and out of state, often with assistance from the boys. The children were also engaged in prostitution during overnight stays with customers.

Law enforcement became aware of illegal activities at the farm after his advertisements appeared in pornographic magazines and from material found during the investigations of New Orleans Boy Scout Troop 137 and Brother Paul's Children's Mission. During the execution of a search warrant at the farm, police discovered developed and undeveloped photographs of child pornography, as well as card catalogs containing the names of hundreds of current and previous financial contributors. Several of the sponsors would go on to testify against Vermilye at his trial in exchange for legal immunity in Tennessee.

According to several boys who went on to testify, their homosexual activities were consensual, and none mentioned any use of force on Vermilye's part. One, however, said it was understood that the photography sessions were required if they wanted to continue living at the farm. Vermilye denied knowledge or responsibility for most of the photographs and said that he had shot a few of them for an artist and for "sublimation counseling" with his homosexual clients, whom he was trying to help stay closeted. He claimed the remaining photographs were placed on the farm by agents of an unspecified "national child porn ring".

In addition to the crimes committed against his wards, Vermilye also used his son William for child pornography. William disappeared near The University of the South on July 5, 1974, and was never found.

== Legal proceedings ==
Following Vermilye's November 10, 1976 arrest, ex-ward David Forrister sued the state of Tennessee for $1 million, claiming that corrections officials placed him in a male prostitution ring and willfully neglected their duty to investigate the facility. Forrister's lawyer claimed that he and other boys who refused to cooperate were beaten and subjected to "constant pressure to conform".

On June 3, 1977, a jury of ten found Vermilye guilty. He was sentenced to five to ten years of imprisonment for crimes against nature and ten to fifteen years for aiding and abetting crimes against nature, totaling an effective sentence of 25 to 40 years in prison. In 1978, he was deposed from the priesthood while free on bond, pending a later failed appeal to the Supreme Court.

In 1984, Vermilye again sought retrial, claiming that his conviction and sentences were void due to a denial of his constitutional right to effective legal counsel. His request was denied by the Supreme Court in December 1987.

== Later life ==
Vermilye died on June 22, 2018, in Kill Devil Hills, North Carolina, aged 89.

== See also ==
- John David Norman
- Roy Ames

== Cited works ==
- Linedecker, Clifford (1981). Children in Chains. New York City: Everest House. ISBN 0896960889.
