= South Fox Island Light =

Lighthouse in Michigan, United States

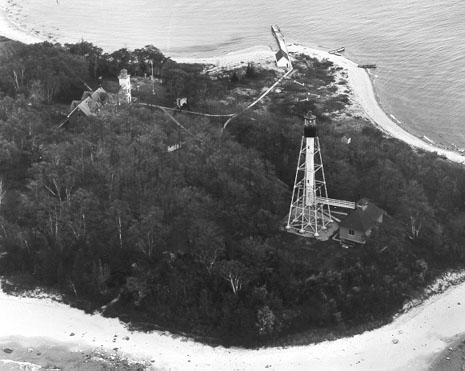
- South Fox Island Light showing old tower on left and new tower on right (USCG)
- Location: South Fox Island, Michigan
- Coordinates: 45.3785°N 85.8371°W

Tower
- Constructed: 1867
- Foundation: Stone (first tower) concrete (second tower)
- Construction: Brick (first tower) iron (second tower)
- Automated: 1958
- Height: 39 feet (12 m) (first tower); 60 feet (18 m) (second tower)
- Shape: Square tower attached to house (first tower) pyramidal skeleton tower (second tower)
- Heritage: National Register of Historic Places listed place

Light
- First lit: 1867 (first tower); 1934 (second tower)
- Deactivated: 1969
- Focal height: 68 feet (21 m) (first tower); 89 feet (27 m) (second tower)
- Lens: fourth-order Fresnel lens
- South Fox Island Light Station
- U.S. National Register of Historic Places
- Nearest city: Northport, Michigan
- Area: 10.4 acres (4.2 ha)
- Built by: Lou Comfort, Charles Tilley
- NRHP reference No.: 100006861
- Added to NRHP: August 26, 2021

The South Fox Island Light was a light station located on South Fox Island in the north end of Lake Michigan. There are two towers standing at the site: the first is the original brick keeper's house and tower, while the second is a skeletal tower moved to this site from Sapelo Island, Georgia in 1934. Neither is operational. The station was listed on the National Register of Historic Places in 2021.

== History ==
Congress appropriated $18,000 in 1867 for the construction of this light, and it was first lit in November of that year. This structure was built of Cream City brick and consisted of a keeper's house with attached tower; a fourth-order Fresnel lens was used for the flashing red beacon.

In 1880 the light keeper erected a fence around the station in order to reduce drifting snow and sand, which were making access to the property difficult at times; this was supplemented in 1892 with a network of wooden walkways joining the various station buildings. More substantial changes commenced in 1895 with the addition of a steam whistle fog signal, which was replaced in 1929 with a diaphone horn; at the same time the beacon was converted from kerosene to electricity. A wooden house was erected for an assistant keeper in 1898; this was replaced by a red brick duplex in 1910.

In 1934 the old tower was deactivated in favor of a skeletal tower erected somewhat closer to the point. This tower was taken from the Sapelo Island Light station in Georgia, which had been discontinued the previous year. The station was automated in 1958, and the light was finally discontinued in 1969. Neither tower was demolished, however, and in 1971 the federal government transferred the land surrounding the light station to the Michigan Department of Natural Resources, which entertained the lead of establishing a harbor of refuge at the site. The light station itself was also transferred to the state in 1980.

Two-thirds of the island was owned by David V. Johnson, a local developer who also purchased North Fox Island in 1994; the following year a land swap was proposed which would have given the state North Fox in exchange for Johnson receiving the remainder of South Fox. This set off a legal battle initiated by the Grand Traverse Band of Ottawa and Chippewa Indians, who claimed rights to use of the island on the basis of an 1836 treaty; the local DNR district also objected to the swap, saying that the south island was more important to its mission than the north. After several years of hearings, the swap proposal was modified in 2001 to leave the portion incorporating the light station in the hands of the state; after the tribal claim was denied by the courts in the following year, the swap was allowed to proceed.

Preservation efforts began in 1984, when a band of ten members of the Michigan Youth Corp performed a cleanup of the light station grounds. The Fox Island Lighthouse Association (FILA) applied for nonprofit status in 2005 and began restoration in 2006.

== Description ==
The South Fox Island Light Station includes 9 buildings spread over about ten acres. The most significant is the Lighthouse and Keeper's Dwelling, constructed in 1867. The building is constructed from yellow brick which has been whitewashed. The lighthouse tower is square and four stories tall, with windows on the first three floors and a decagonal iron lantern room on the fourth. The tower projects from the center of the façade of the dwelling, which is a single-story, front-gable building. The tower is flanked by six-over-six wood windows, with additional windows on other elevations, along with a hipped dormer in the gable roof. A shed addition is in the rear of the building. Near the light is the Assistant Keepers’ Quarters, constructed in 1910. This is a two-story side-gable triplex, constructed of red brick. The dwelling contains three units: a two-story one at the west end and one unit on each floor at the east end.

About 365 feet from these buildings are the Fog Signal Building and a skeletal tower. The fog signal building is a frame, one-story, hip-roof building constructed in 1895. The nearby tower is a pyramidal steel structure, 28 feet square at the base and 104 feet tall. It was originally built in 1905 on Sapelo Island, Georgia, but was moved and reassembled at the present location in 1934.

Also nearby is an 1895 oil house, an 1897 boathouse, an 1897 workshop, and a smokehouse of unknown era. A modern outhouse and maintenance shed are also on the location, as well as a small cemetery containing two graves and the remains of a dock in the water.
