= Catherine Stubblefield Wilson =

American distributor of child pornography (born 1939)

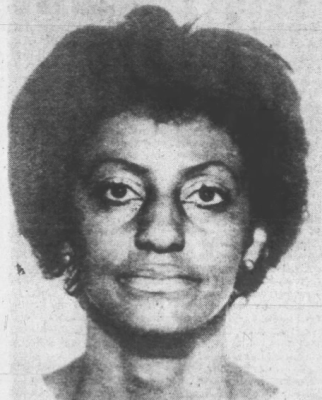
- 1982 mug shot of Wilson
- Born: Catherine Stubblefield; July 12, 1939 (age 87); Madison Parish, Louisiana, U.S.
- Other names: "Kiddie Porn Queen" "Black Cathy"; Jackie Star; Jackie Steen
- Years active: 1977–1982 (child pornography)
- Spouse: Lucius Wilson (m. 1966; div. 1973)
- Children: 5
- Convictions: Distribution of child pornography; distribution of obscene materials; welfare fraud
- Penalty: 10 years' imprisonment 4 years' imprisonment 5 years' imprisonment

Details
- Date apprehended: May 5, 1982

Catherine Stubblefield Wilson (née Stubblefield; July 12, 1939) is an American woman who operated one of the largest child pornography distribution networks in history.

Beginning in 1963, Wilson was active in the adult pornography business. From 1977 to 1982, she ran an enterprise called B.B.C. Star Inc., which controlled up to 80 percent of child pornography circulating in the United States, earning her the label of America's "Kiddie Porn Queen".

Prosecutors did not accuse Wilson of producing any child pornography herself.

== Personal life ==
Wilson was born on July 12, 1939, in Madison Parish, Louisiana. As of 1940, she was sharing a rural home outside of Delhi with ten other relatives, including her mother and grandfather.

At the time of her final arrest, Wilson was a divorced mother of five and grandmother residing in a two-story mansion in the affluent Hancock Park, Los Angeles. Her daughter Delina described her as "a very good mom".

Through the wealth accrued from her operation, Wilson's children were attending a private school, and she owned a luxury car collection, which included a 1981 BMW, a Cadillac Seville, a Lincoln Continental, a Mercedes-Benz, and a Rolls-Royce. She also owned real estate and fraudulently received welfare benefits between 1980 and 1982, collecting over $600 a month (equivalent to $2,000 in 2025).

== B.B.C. Star Inc. ==
Following a nationwide crackdown on child pornography throughout the late 1970s and early 1980s, Wilson's business filled a vacuum as adult bookstores stopped selling the material. To build a base of customers, Wilson bought mailing lists for softcore adult pornography, then sent out advertisements offering pornographic films of "young" people for $30 a piece.

To avoid apprehension, Wilson used pseudonyms to open bank accounts and post office boxes in several countries, including Denmark, Switzerland, and the Cayman Islands. To obtain the material, customers would send orders to a front company in Denmark, where one of Wilson's accomplices would code the orders and send them back to Wilson. Customers would then be mailed 8 mm reproductions of pre-existing child pornography films from a network of mailboxes in California, Arizona, and Nevada, which Wilson drove to and filled each month.

The operation was headquartered out of Wilson's mansion in Hancock Park and catered to over 30,000 customers worldwide. In her last two years of business, she netted over $1,000,000, though police alleged that she made over $5,000,000 in total.

== Investigation and sentencing ==
In April 1980, Wilson was sentenced to three years' probation on one count of conspiring to distribute child pornography, to which she pleaded no contest.

On May 5, 1982, Wilson and her accomplice, Richard Eugene Trolio (1939–1989), were arrested on charges of felony distribution of child pornography. Trolio was arrested at his home in Woodland Hills, and Wilson was arrested while driving near her home in Hancock Park. Shortly after, they were both released on $5,000 bail. On the day of their arrests, six locations were searched by police, including a warehouse in Chatsworth where the duo housed their child pornography collection, which included Kinder Orgy, Little but Lewd, and Randy Lolitas, among other films. The investigation into identifying Wilson had allegedly been ongoing since 1972.

During a search of Wilson's home, police discovered what they called a "golden list" hidden under her youngest child's crib, which contained the contact information of 7,000 individuals who subscribed to the most extreme material she offered, such as bestiality and pornography involving children as young as six. Seventy films were found stacked beside a child's bicycle in her home.

On top of the child pornography charges, Wilson was charged with one count of welfare fraud and five counts of perjury. She was re-arrested on May 11 for violating probation conditions that were set after her 1980 arrest. Wilson did not bring a lawyer to her arraignment and was therefore given a public defender and a new bail set at $500,000. She pleaded innocent. In August 1983, Wilson's bail was reduced to $125,000.

In February 1984, Wilson pleaded guilty to distributing child pornography and was sentenced to four years in prison. On July 20, under the Child Protection Act of 1984, she was sentenced to an additional 10 years in federal prison, three years' probation, and two $10,000 fines. She did not show remorse at trial, comparing her activities to selling everyday products, such as "toothpaste or cigarettes". Also in July, Wilson was sentenced to five years in prison for welfare fraud, to which she pleaded no contest.

According to postal inspector Bill Anderson, the mail-order pornography market "virtually dried up overnight" following Wilson's apprehension. In Beyond Tolerance (2001), Philip Jenkins claimed that the fall of her operation marked the end of the "liberal era" of the child pornography trade in the United States, as she was the last commercial supplier in the country before pedophiles moved to bulletin boards in the 1980s.

== See also ==
- John David Norman
- Brother Paul's Children's Mission

== Cited works ==
- Jenkins, Philip (2001). Beyond Tolerance: Child Pornography on the Internet. New York City, New York: New York University Press. ISBN 978-0814742624.
