= Jerome Schneider =

American financial adviser and author

Jerome Schneider is an American financial adviser and author who encouraged his clients to hide their money from taxes using offshore banks. From the mid-1970s to the late 1990s, he advertised widely and, in his books and seminars, encouraged clients to buy offshore banks for their own purposes. In 2004 Schneider was convicted of conspiring to help clients evade tax laws, leading the New York Times to name him "the nation's best-known seller of fraudulent offshore banks".

United States federal prosecutors began targeting him in 1997, after he was the subject of a televised investigative report on 20/20. In 2002 Schneider and his lawyer, Los Angeles attorney Eric Witmeyer, were indicted for conspiracy to defraud the United States Internal Revenue Service, wire fraud and mail fraud, and originally faced up to 115 years in prison each; after pleading guilty and agreeing to give information to investigators and tax authorities Schneider was sentenced to six months.

Schneider is the author of several books of financial advice, including Hiding Your Money: Everything You Need to Know About Keeping Your Money and Valuables Safe from Predators and Greedy Creditors and How to Own Your Own Private International Bank: For Profit, Privacy, and Tax Protection.

== See also ==
- Marc Harris
