= Fox Islands (Lake Michigan) =

Islands in Leelanau County, Michigan, U.S.

- Location within Michigan

Geography
- Location: Lake Michigan
- Coordinates: 45°26′32″N 85°48′36″W
- Adjacent to: Lake Michigan
- Total islands: 2
- Area: 6.65 sq mi (17.2 km^{2})
- Highest elevation: 577 ft (175.9 m)

Administration
- United States
- State: Michigan
- County: Leelanau County
- Township: Leelanau Township

Demographics
- Population: Uninhabited

Additional information
- Time zone: America/Detroit

The Fox Islands consist of the North Fox and South Fox Islands, in Lake Michigan. The uninhabited islands are approximately 17 miles (27 km) northwest of Cathead Point near the tip of the Leelanau Peninsula of Michigan and about 10 miles (16 km) southwest of Beaver Island. The two islands form part of an archipelago. South Fox Island Light was built in 1867 and operated until 1959. Both islands are part of Leelanau County, Michigan, and are administered by Leelanau Township. Several shipwrecks have occurred on the Fox Islands, or the reefs adjoining them; in 1851, the Illinois was reported as a "total wreck" on the Fox Islands reef, in 1860, the bark Fontanelle ran aground at the Fox Islands, and in 1861, the schooner Nightingale. In 1873, the ships Frank Perew and Magnet encountered trouble at the Fox Islands.

== North Fox Island ==
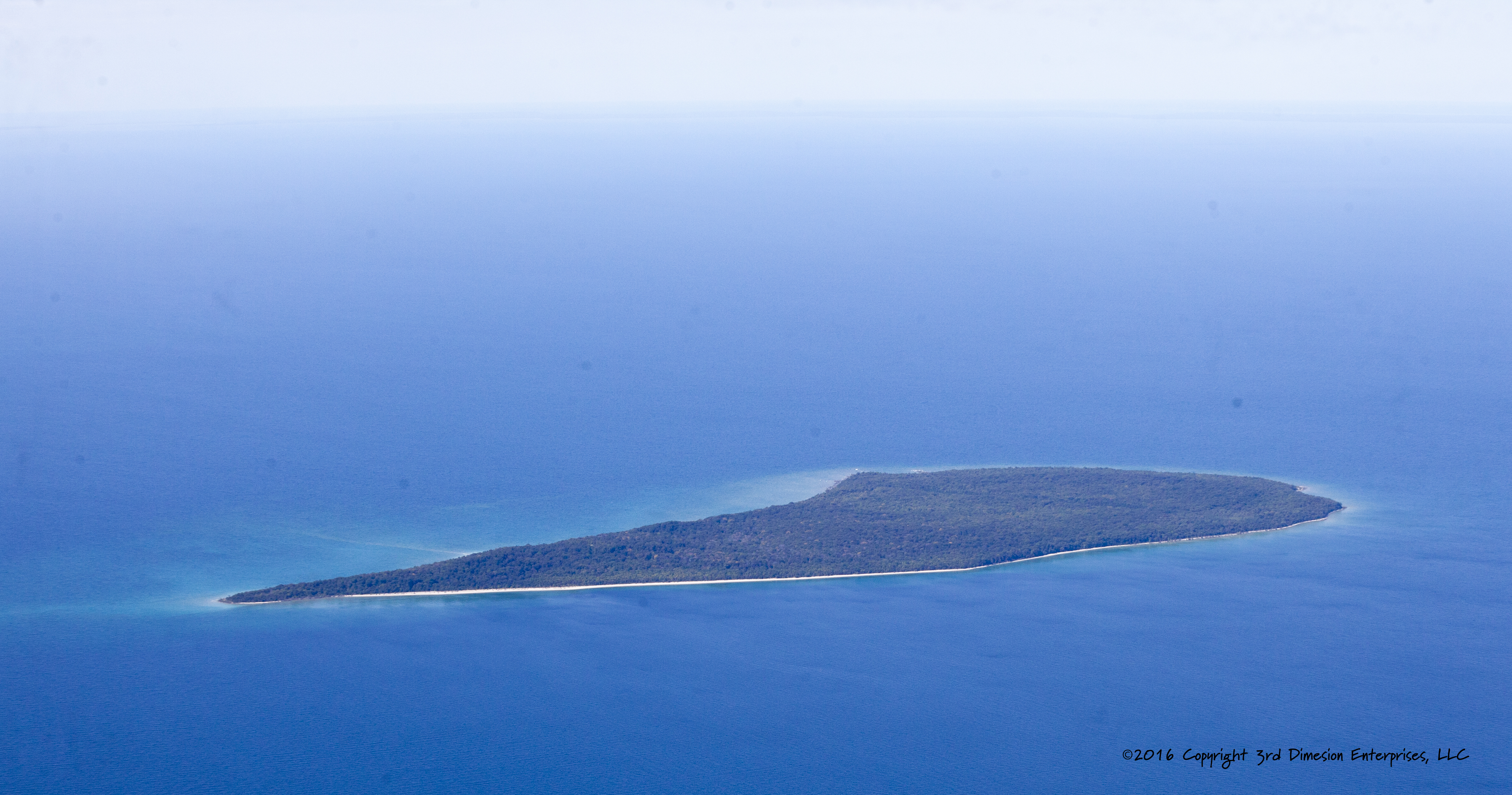
North Fox Island from the east

North Fox (45.4792°N 85.7771°W) is the smaller of the two islands, 1.28 square miles (3.32 km^{2}) in area, roughly 2 miles (3.2 km) wide by 1 mile (1.6 km) long. This island was purchased by real estate magnate David V. Johnson in 1994 for $1.3 million, and the entire island was sold back to the state of Michigan for $2.2 million at the end of the year 2000.

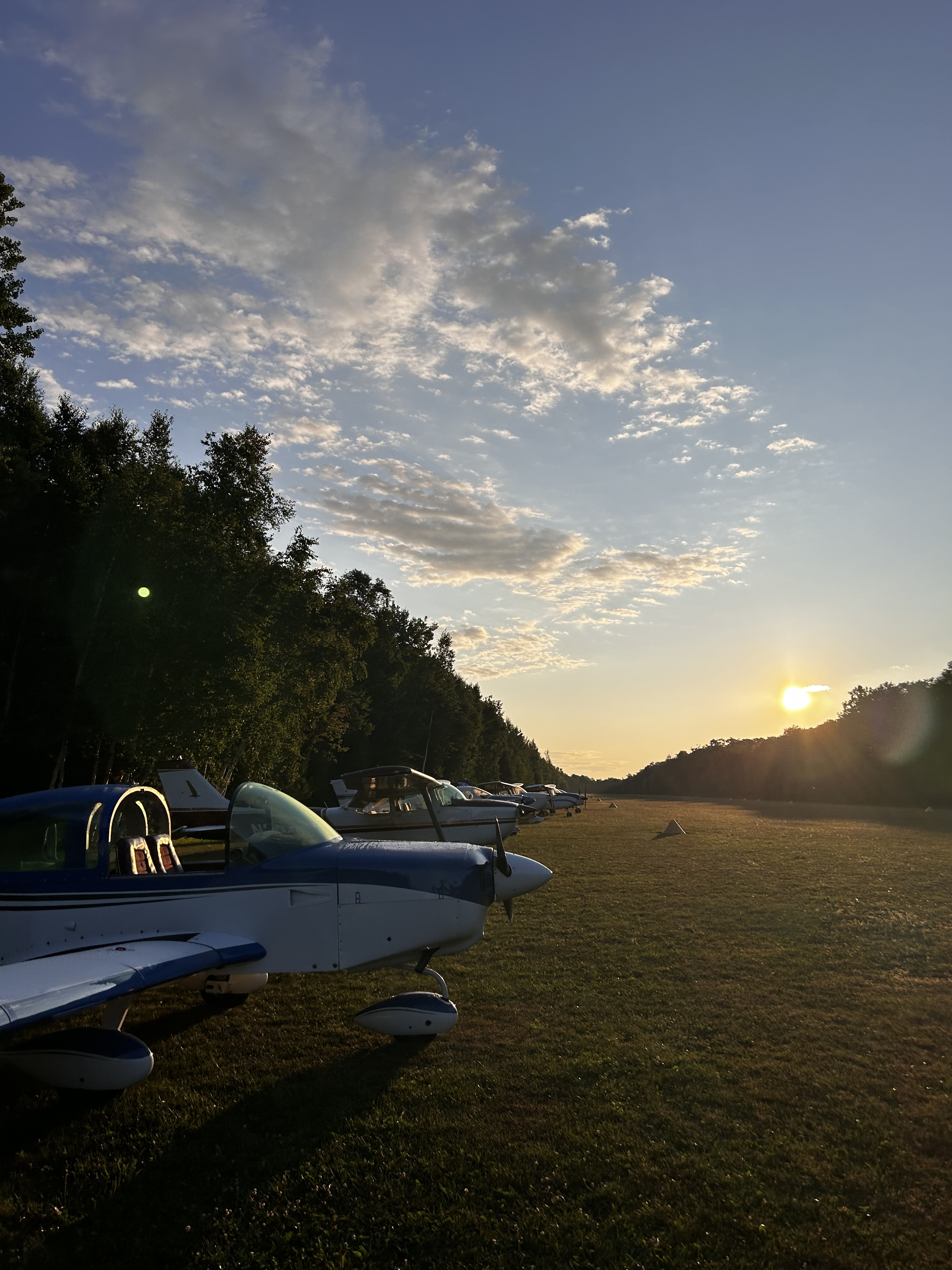
North Fox Island airstrip during an August sunrise in 2023

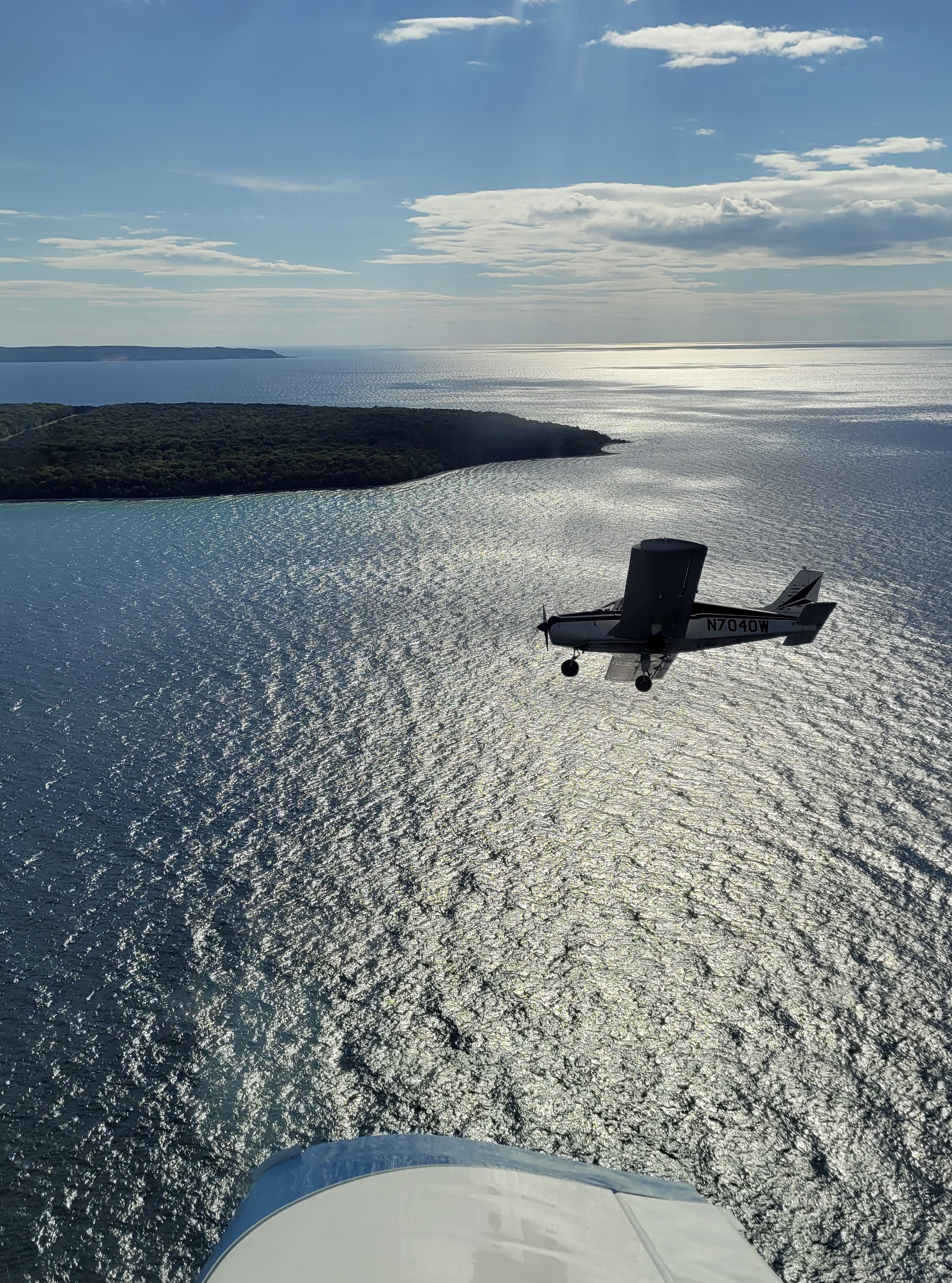
Aircraft in formation circling around the northern end of North Fox Island

=== Aviation ===
North Fox Island has an operational public 3,001-foot-long by 100-foot-wide (914m x 30m) grass airstrip as of August 2023, making it accessible by general aviation. Runway 7 has a displaced threshold of 804 ft. and Runway 25 has a displaced threshold of 999 ft. Both runways have trees at their ends ranging from 35 to 65 ft. tall. The airport designation is 6Y3. Communications are on radio frequency 122.900. Overfly the runway before entering the traffic pattern. The runway is closed from November to April and when snow-covered. The runway is not plowed and is very soft during the Spring and after rain. There are no instrument procedures into this airport and the airstrip elevation is 639 ft. The nearest public airport with procedures and services is Beaver Island Airport (KSJX) which is 15 nm NE of North Fox. The nearest mainland public airport with procedures and services is Charlevoix Municipal Airport (KCVX) which is 24 nm SE of North Fox. North Fox Island is remote with no available services (no fuel, maintenance facilities, cell service, weather coverage, etc.) other than an outhouse.

This airstrip is maintained by volunteers and through financial support of the Recreational Aviation Foundation.

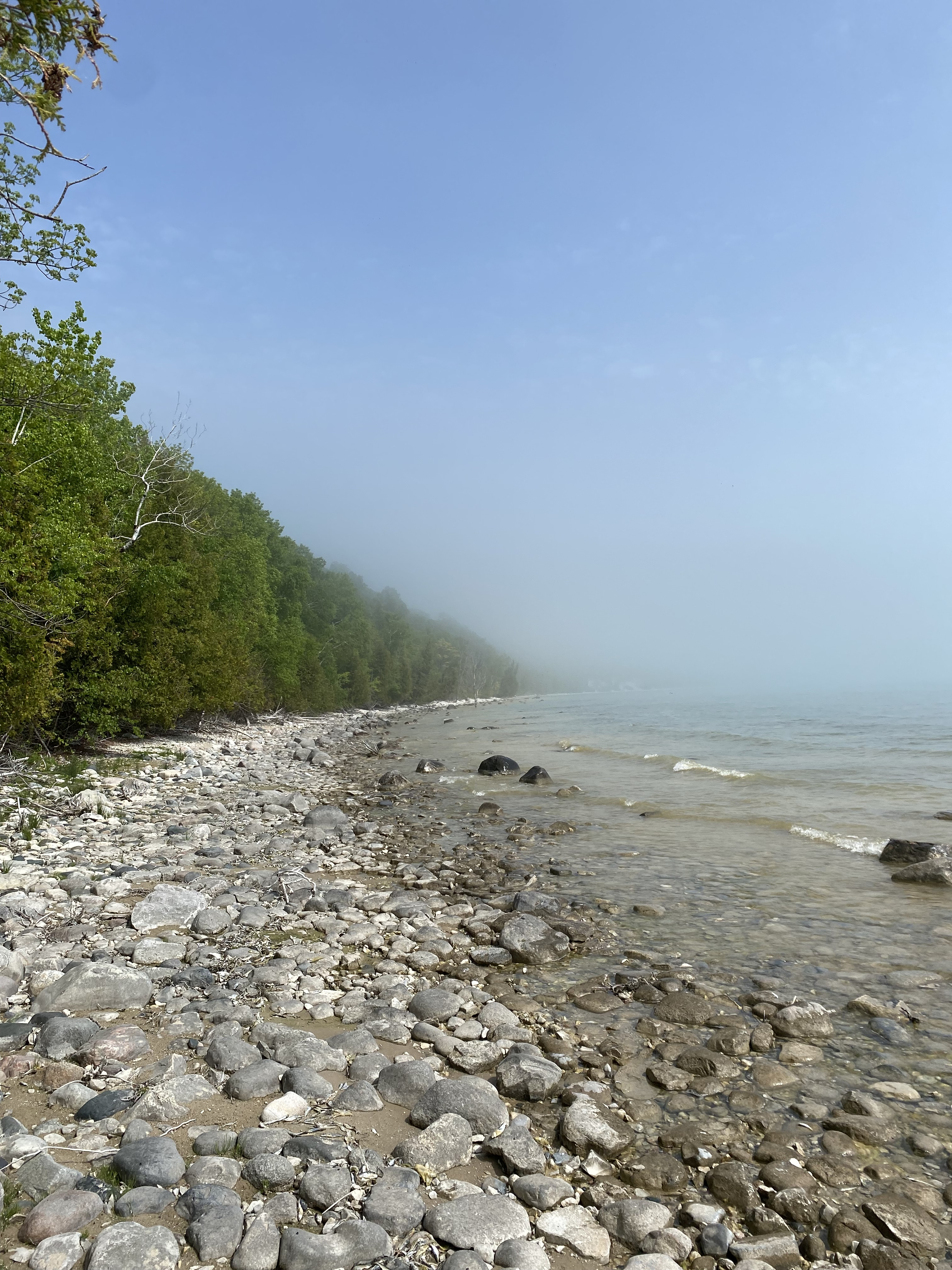
The southwestern shore of North Fox Island

=== Recreation ===
The waters of North Fox are used for swimming, free diving, and scuba diving. There are at least four known wrecks off the shores of the island. The beaches range from rocky to sandy, and are known for sunbathing. There are no lifeguards and cell service is not reliable. If boating in, there is no harbor, and anchors must be used. Shallow and rocky waters surround the island. Camping and fires are allowed in designated areas only (Southwestern end of the airstrip). Hunting is by permit only. The island is currently operated as part of the Beaver Islands State Wildlife Research Area. More information can be found at the Michigan DNR's website.

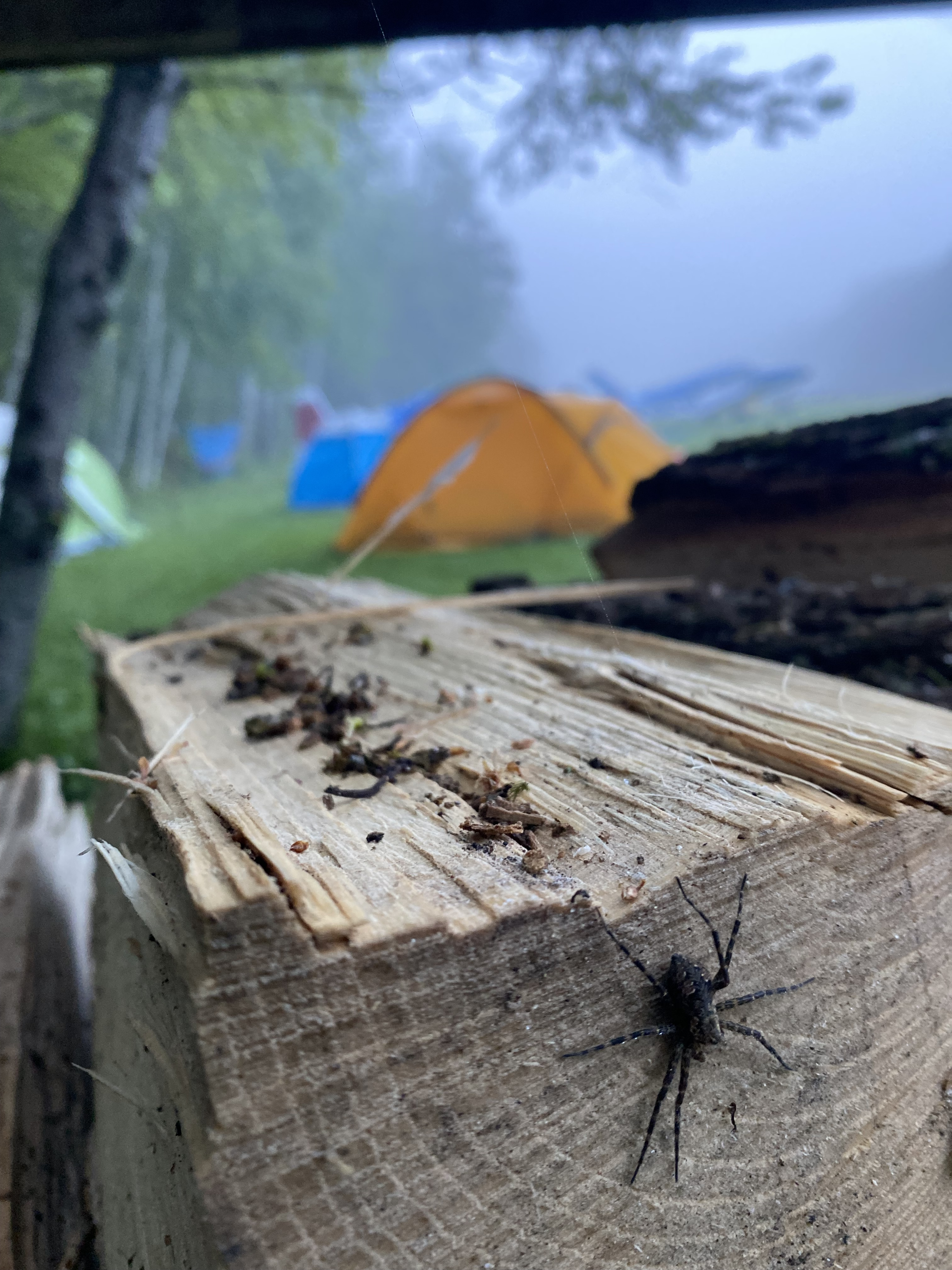
One of the many spiders found on North Fox Island

=== Criminal history ===
In 1976, a child pornography ring was discovered to be operating on North Fox Island. The proprietor of the island, Francis Shelden, allegedly with help from Dyer Grossman, Adam Starchild, and Gerald Richards, created a fraudulent charity they named Brother Paul's Children's Mission as a cover to fly boys in Shelden's private plane to his island retreat.

Two suspects were indicted for the North Fox Island sex ring: Shelden and Richards. Shelden was never convicted, having fled the United States for the Netherlands in 1976, and was reported dead in 1996. Richards, a schoolteacher, served a prison term for child pornography charges and was arrested again on child pornography charges in 1988 before killing himself in 1998. The crimes have long been suspected to have ties to the Oakland County Child Killer case, which involved the unsolved murders of four children in 1976–77. O.C.C.K. suspect Christopher Busch was a known subscriber to the North Fox Island sex ring, and investigators also believe that the perpetrator of the Oakland County killings could have been someone who victimized the group.

== South Fox Island ==
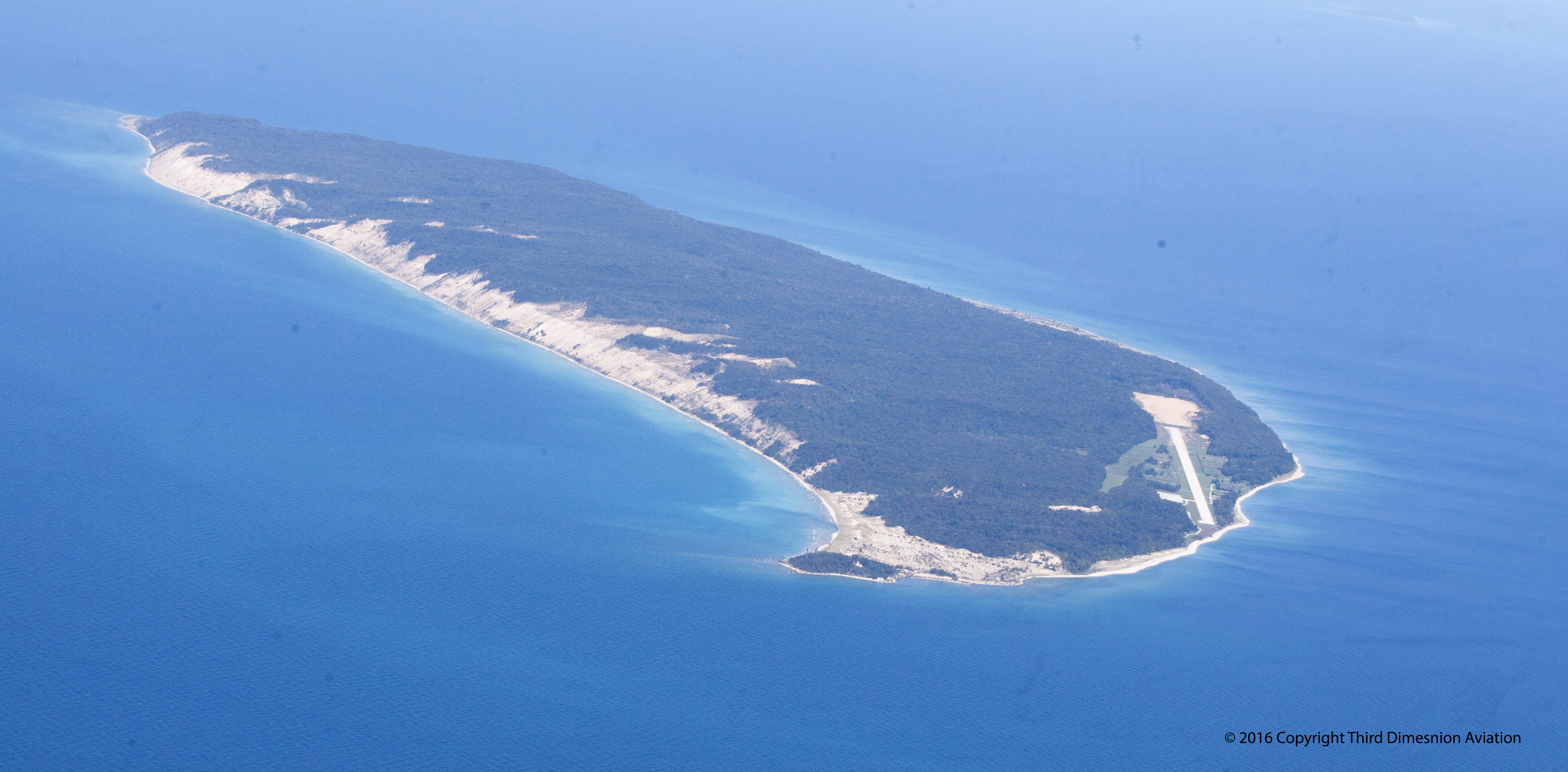
South Fox Island from the south

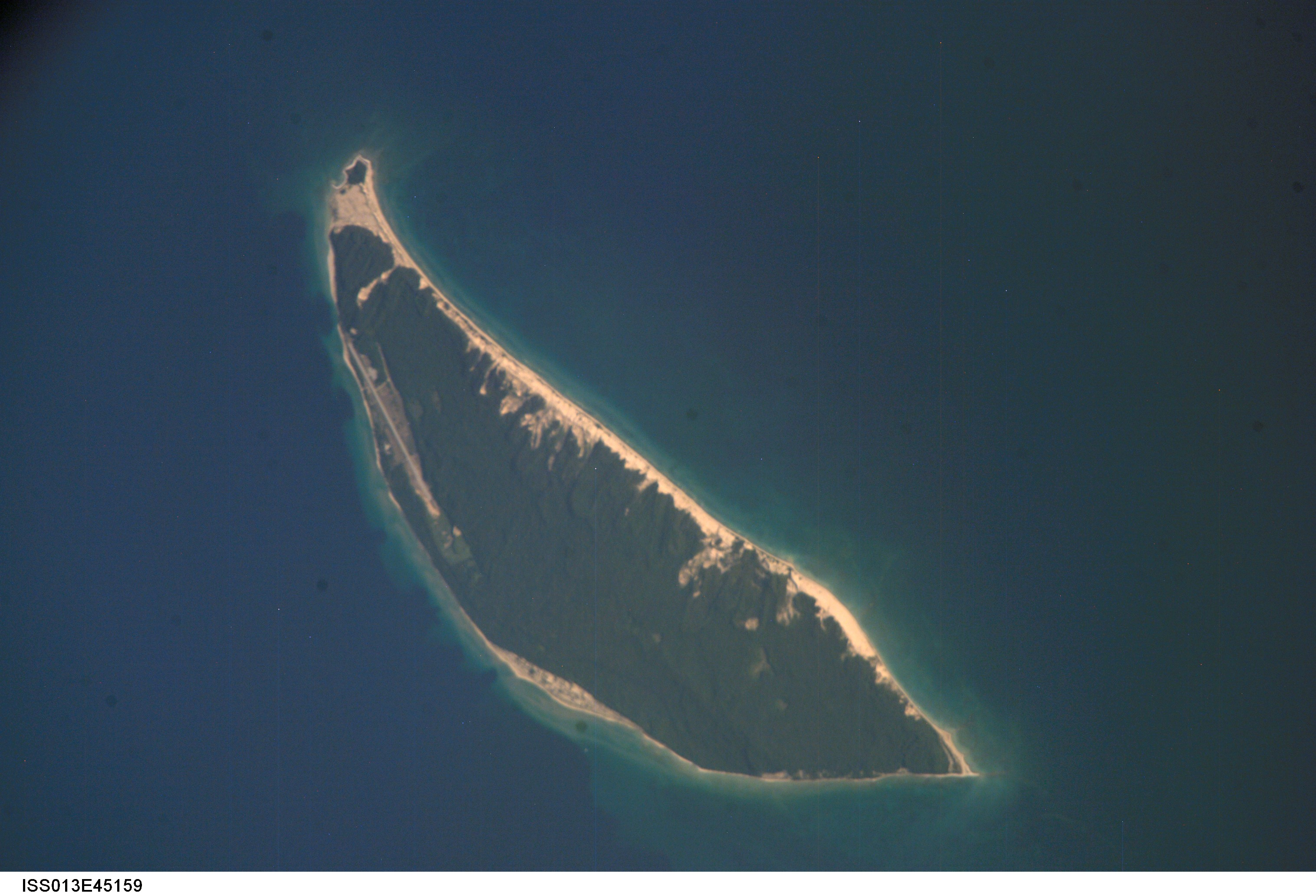
South Fox Island, taken from the International Space Station in 2006

South Fox Island (45.4156°N 85.8463°W) is 13.89 square kilometres (5.36 sq mi; 3,430 acres) in area, and about 5 miles (8.0 km) long and 1.5 miles (2.4 km) wide. As of 2001, David V. Johnson also owned about two-thirds of South Fox. The other third was owned by the state of Michigan, including the two lighthouses on the southern tip of the island. There is no ferry service to South Fox, and it has no docks, fuel or sheltered harbor. However, a private airport with a 5,500-foot (1,700 m) private runway can accommodate jet aircraft.

Two generations of the South Fox Island Light stand at the southern extremity of the island. The first, built in 1867, is a brick house with attached tower; the second, a skeletal tower, is the former Sapelo Island Light, which was moved to the site in 1934. The Fox Island Lighthouse Association (FILA), a non-profit organization, was formed in 2004 to aid in preservation of the light station structures.

Johnson built a paved runway and a residence on the southern island; the runway is about 1600 metres long. He had originally proposed swapping North Fox Island with the state for the third of South Fox that he did not own, but he settled in 2003 for a consolidation deal which traded 218 acres (88 ha) of state owned land on the southern part of South Fox for 219 acres (89 ha) on the north and central parts of the same island. This deal was finalized in March 2003. Johnson owns 2,204 acres (892 ha) of the isolated 3,400 acres (1,400 ha) Lake Michigan island 25 miles (40 km) west of the Leelanau County coast.

The island includes a cemetery where members of the Grand Traverse Band of Native Americans are currently buried. These islands are historically important for the three federally recognized tribes of Odawa peoples in Michigan, the Grand Traverse Band, the Little River Band of Ottawa Indians and the Little Traverse Bay Bands of Odawa Indians.

Deer were introduced onto the island in 1915. Hunting is permitted on state land.

== Native Americans names of Fox Islands ==
There are three federally recognized tribes of Odawa peoples in Michigan, the Grand Traverse Band, the Little River Band of Ottawa Indians and the Little Traverse Bay Bands of Odawa Indians. These tribes are also known as Anishinaabeg (adjectival: Anishinaabe) and are a group of culturally related indigenous peoples present in the Great Lakes region of Canada and the United States. They include the Ojibwe (including Saulteaux and Oji-Cree), Odawa, Potawatomi, Mississaugas, Nipissing and Algonquin peoples. The Anishinaabe speak Anishinaabemowin, or Anishinaabe languages that belong to this group.

The Anishinaabe people that live in and around Harbor Springs, Michigan, have a long history of occupation of the land in northern Michigan. From this history and engagement with their land comes cultural stories that have been recorded by Jane Willetts Ettawageshik. These Anishinaabe stories speak of how the Anishinaabe people related to their land, to their people, and various other means of communicating their values, outlooks and histories. Jane Willetts Ettawageshik recorded various stories in Odawa of the Odawa peoples in northern Michigan. These stories have been translated into a book "Ottawa Stories from the Springs, Anishinaabe dibaadjimowinan wodi gaa binjibaamigak wodi mookodjiwong e zhinikaadek" by Howard Webkamigad.

One such story is "Anishinaabe ikwewizens miinawaa do animookaadjiinmon / The Story of the Young Anishinaabe Woman and Her Dog". This story tells of a young Anishinaabe woman who comes of age and is told to seek her sacred vision. After 10 days, she comes back to the village knowing her sacred vision and eventually the young woman runs away with her dog. The young woman finds an abandoned island and mates with her dog and has dog/human hybrid children. Eventually, some Anishinaabe warriors come across her island finding the woman, her spouse-dog and their dog/human children. The Anishinaabe warriors go back to their village and tell the woman's older brother about his sister. The brother goes and kills his sister and her family. The Anishinaabe outlaw animal / human marriage because of this woman as well as name two islands after the woman and her dog husband, animookaadjiinon, though the name has been changed in English to North and South Fox Islands.
