= Oakland County Child Killer =

Unidentified serial murderer

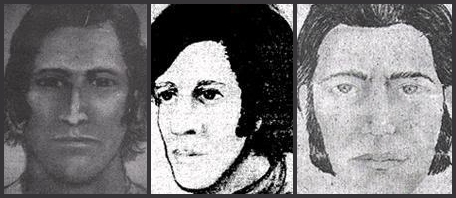
- Composite sketches of the suspect
- Other names: The Babysitter Killer; The Snow Murderer

Details
- Victims: 4+
- Span of crimes: February 15, 1976 – March 16, 1977
- Country: United States
- State: Michigan

The Oakland County Child Killer (OCCK) is the name given to the perpetrator(s) responsible for the serial killings of at least four children in Oakland County, Michigan, between 1976 and 1977. The children who were murdered were last seen in the company of a young to middle-aged man with a defined face, sharp nose, and long black hair. The victims were held captive before being killed, and the four deaths triggered a murder investigation, which at the time was the largest in U.S. history, with Detroit's two daily newspapers, as well as the area's numerous radio and television stations, covering the case. A presentation on WXYT radio, titled Winter's Fear: The Children, the Killer, the Search, won the Peabody Award in 1977.

Forensic DNA testing has indirectly implicated two suspects, one of whom has since died, with the other serving life in prison for sexual offenses against children. A DNA profile of the main perpetrator was created from samples taken from some of the victims' bodies but does not match the DNA of anyone named in connection with the case; the perpetrator's identity is unknown.

== Background ==
Between February 15, 1976 and March 16, 1977, two boys and two girls aged between 10 and 12 went missing outside their homes, en route to or from another location, in Oakland County, Michigan, north of Detroit. Each child's body was discovered in a public area within nineteen days of his or her disappearance. The children were all either strangled or shot, with the two boys having been sexually abused. Once the victims were dead, the offender dispersed their bodies around Oakland County in places where they could be seen from roadways.

== Victims ==
=== Confirmed ===
- Mark Douglas Stebbins, 12, of Ferndale, did not return home from an American Legion Hall on February 15, 1976. His body was found four days later, wearing the same clothes he was last seen in, lying on a pile of wood and dirt in the parking lot of a local office building in Southfield. He had been strangled and sexually abused with a foreign object and had two lacerations to the left rear of his head. Rope marks were evident on both his wrists and ankles, indicating he had been bound during his captivity.
- Jill Robinson, 12, of Royal Oak, left her home on December 22, 1976, following an argument with her mother over dinner preparations. The following day, her bicycle was found behind a local hobby store, before her body was found alongside Interstate 75 in Troy, within view of the Troy police station, on the morning of December 26. She had been shot in the face with a 12-gauge shotgun, and her body was fully clothed and wearing the backpack she had taken with her when she left home. Autopsy reports revealed that Robinson had been fed and cared for for at least three days before she was killed.

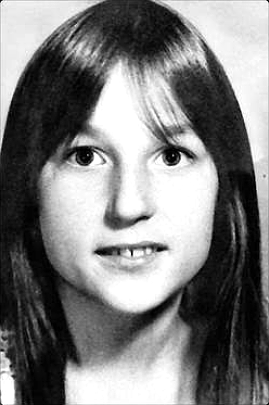
Kristine Mihelich

Timothy King

- Kristine Marie Mihelich, 10, of Berkley, was reported missing on January 2, 1977, after she failed to return home from a 7-Eleven store on 12 Mile Road at Oakshire. A mail carrier found her fully clothed body nineteen days later on the side of a rural road in Franklin Village. She had been smothered to death less than 24 hours earlier, and her body lay within view of nearby homes.
- Timothy John King, 11, left his home in Birmingham and went to a pharmacy on the evening of March 16, 1977. After he failed to return home, an intensive search covering the entire Detroit metropolitan area was conducted before his body was found on the evening of March 22 by two teenagers in a shallow ditch alongside Gill Road in Livonia. He had been sexually assaulted with a foreign object and suffocated approximately six hours earlier. Autopsy results revealed that King had eaten Kentucky Fried Chicken shortly before his death and that he was cleaned and groomed prior to his suffocation.

=== Suspected ===
- 17-year-old Donna Serra went missing after hitchhiking to a beach after school in Macomb County, Michigan, on September 29, 1972. Serra's body was discovered face down in a shallow creek on October 20, 1972, in her hometown of Ray Township in Macomb County, close to 27 Mile Road. Before she was killed, Serra had been imprisoned and drugged for several days. Her death was due to strangulation. Her murder remains unsolved.
- 13-year-old Jane Louise "Janey" Allan went missing on August 8, 1976, and was last seen hitchhiking between Pontiac and Royal Oak in Oakland County, Michigan. Allan was found dead floating in a river in Miamisburg, Ohio, on August 11, 1976, four days later, over 200 miles away from her Royal Oak home. Her wrists had been tied behind her back with torn strips of a T-shirt. Decomposition of the body left police unable to determine whether or not Allan had been sexually assaulted, but they were able to ascertain that Allan had been dead before being dumped in the water. She had died from carbon monoxide poisoning.
- Kimberly Alice "Kim" King, 12, disappeared from Warren on September 15, 1979. She had stayed over at a friend's house that night. When she called her sister at 11:00 p.m., she claimed to have snuck out of her friend's house and to be phoning from a nearby outdoor phone booth. Her sister instructed her to return inside. However, Kimberly never went back to her friend's house and has not been seen or heard from since. Authorities believe she was abducted and that her disappearance is connected to the unsolved killings.

=== Disproved ===
- 16-year-old Judy Ferro was found beaten and strangled on January 1, 1976, at Lola Valley Park in Redford, Michigan. She had vanished between midnight and 3 a.m. from the home where she had been babysitting. A Redford Township policeman discovered Ferro's body at 7 a.m., fully dressed. When it was learned that Gary Pervinkler, 19, had left his home the same evening with a gun and his father's automobile, he was identified as a prime suspect. On April 7, 1976, Pervinkler's body was discovered; he had shot himself in the head. The firearm found next to Pervinkler's body matched a bullet casing discovered in the house from where Ferro was abducted. Her case was closed.
- Cynthia Rae "Cindy" Cadieux, 16, of Roseville, was found bludgeoned to death on January 16, 1976, in Bloomfield Township. Cynthia had been abducted while hitchhiking in the 11 Mile area of Roseville, between Gratiot and Grosbeck, on January 14, 1976. Her naked body was found shortly after; she had been tied up, raped, and then beaten to death. In 1979, Robert Anglin and Raymond Heinrich were both convicted of her murder. A third individual, who has not been named, was also involved, but he died before their arrest. Both men were sentenced to life in prison.
- Sheila Srock, 14, was raped and shot dead while babysitting in Birmingham, Michigan, on January 20, 1976. While shoveling the snow off his roof, a neighbor had witnessed her killer, Oliver Rhodes Andrews, as he burglarized homes in the neighborhood. Andrews was sentenced to life imprisonment.

== Investigation ==
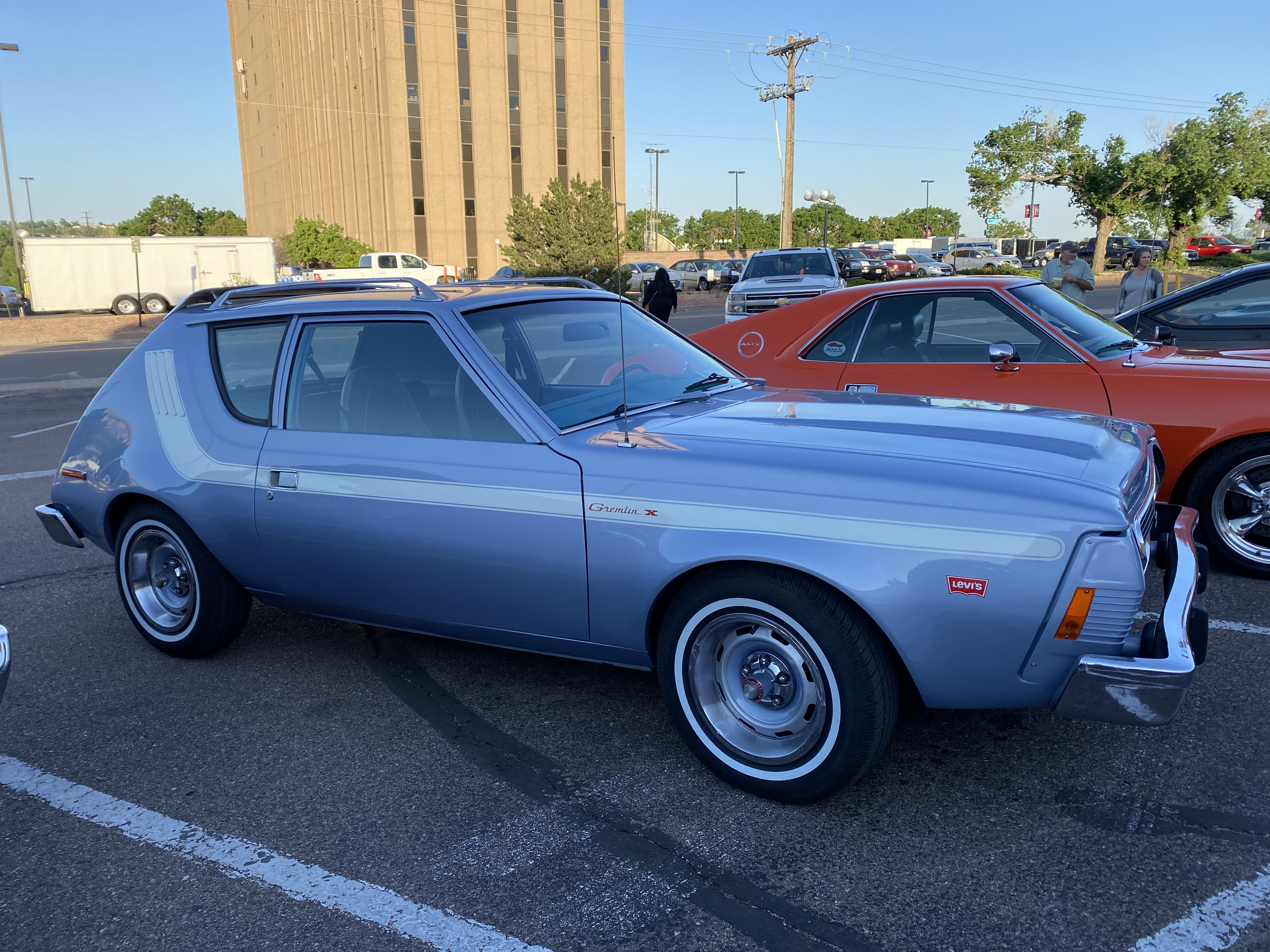
Blue 1974 AMC Gremlin, near-identical to that which the investigation focused on

After the discovery of Mihelich's body, authorities noticed similarities shared by her case and those of Stebbins and Robinson, and reports were released warning the public that a serial killer was possibly operating in the Oakland County area. The Michigan State Police led a group of law-enforcement officials from thirteen communities in the formation of a task force devoted solely to the investigation into the killings of the three children.

After King disappeared, a woman told authorities that she had seen a boy with a skateboard (like King) talking to a man in the parking lot of the pharmacy that he visited on March 16, 1977. Authorities released a composite drawing of the suspected kidnapper and the blue AMC Gremlin parked near him in the lot, and authorities questioned every Gremlin owner in Oakland County. Investigators created a profile based on witnesses' descriptions of the man seen talking to King—a white male aged between 25 and 35 with a dark complexion, shaggy hair, and sideburns, who had a job that gave him freedom of movement and made him appear trustworthy to children, was familiar with the area, and could keep children captive for long periods of time without rousing neighbors' suspicions.

The task force checked more than 18,000 tips, which resulted in about two dozen arrests on unrelated charges and the discovery of a multi-state child pornography ring named "Brother Paul's Children's Mission" operating on North Fox Island in Lake Michigan. The task force was unable to make much headway in the investigation, disbanding in December 1978, with the investigation being turned over to the State Police.

=== Suspects and persons of interest ===
A few weeks after King's murder, a psychiatrist who worked with the task force received a letter, riddled with spelling errors, written by an anonymous author ("Allen") claiming to be a sadomasochistic slave of the killer ("Frank"). "Allen" wrote that they had both served in the Vietnam War, that "Frank" was traumatized by having killed children, and that "Frank" had taken revenge on more affluent citizens, such as the residents of Birmingham, for sending forces to Vietnam. "Allen" expressed fear and remorse in his letter, saying he was losing his sanity and was endangered and suicidal, and admitted to having accompanied "Frank" as the latter sought boys to kill. He instructed the psychiatrist to respond by printing the code words "weather bureau says trees to bloom in three weeks" in that Sunday's edition of the Detroit Free Press, before offering to provide photographic evidence in exchange for immunity from prosecution. The psychiatrist arranged to meet "Allen" at a bar, but "Allen" did not show up and was never heard from again.

David Norberg was considered a suspect until 1999. Norberg, who died in 1981, was found with jewelry that some police officers believed were connected to the victims. In 1999, Norberg's body was exhumed at his Wyoming grave, and no DNA match was found to connect him to the case. Family members of Timothy King and Kristine Mihelich have denied that they recognized the jewelry.

Archibald Edward Sloan, a child molester who victimized young boys in his neighborhood, became a person of interest after hair samples found in his 1966 Pontiac Bonneville matched hair found on the bodies of King and Stebbins, but the hair was not from Sloan himself. A witness claimed to have seen King being abducted by two men, one described as being in his late 20s and the other described as bearing a strong resemblance to serial killer John Wayne Gacy, who was allegedly in Michigan around the time of the killings. Gacy's DNA did not match DNA found on the victims' bodies.

Police in Parma Heights, Ohio, arrested Ted Lamborgine, a retired auto worker involved in a 1970s sex ring that preyed on young boys in Detroit's Cass Corridor. Out of the five men involved in the ring, Lamborgine was one of only two living members of that ring when they were charged in 2006. Lamborgine faced 19 counts of sexually assaulting children, while his partner in the ring, Richard Lawson, faced 28 similar charges. On March 27, 2007, investigators told Detroit television station WXYZ that Lamborgine was considered the top suspect in this case. Lamborgine pleaded guilty to fifteen sex-related counts involving young boys rather than accept a plea bargain that would have required him to take a polygraph test on the Oakland County killings. He also rejected an offer of a reduced sentence in exchange for a polygraph on the case. In October 2007, the family of Mark Stebbins filed a wrongful death lawsuit against Lamborgine seeking $25,000. The lawsuit alleges Lamborgine, who lived in Metro Detroit in the late 1970s, abducted Stebbins and held him captive in a Royal Oak house for four days in February 1976 before smothering him to death during a sexual assault. Lamborgine has never been formally linked to or charged with the murder of Stebbins. Attorney David A. Binkley has sought compensation, including funeral costs, for Stebbins' brother, Michael, but stressed that money is secondary.

The case sparked new interest when King's father Barry and brother Chris tried to get the State Police to release information about Christopher Brian Busch, the son of General Motors executive Harold Lee Busch. Chris Busch had been in police custody shortly before King's abduction for suspected involvement in child pornography. He committed suicide in November 1978. Bloodstained ligatures were found in his apartment, as was a hand-drawn image of a boy closely resembling Stebbins screaming, which was found pinned to the wall. There had been no confirmed activity by the Oakland County Child Killer for nearly twenty months prior to Busch's death. The State Police have since released 3,400 pages of investigative records to Barry King. In 2012, Oakland County police and prosecutors announced that DNA testing had exonerated Busch of the murders and that they believed the killer to still be alive.

== Resumed investigation and new evidence ==
=== Investigation reports released to families of the victims ===
Police reports obtained by Barry King included new revelations, including DNA testing of new suspects and the bloodstained ligature and sketch from Busch's apartment. Catherine Broad, King's sister, compiled an archive of investigation material as the case grew.

Upon researching the case records, the King family produced a documentary entitled Decades of Deceit, which condemns the police and prosecutors for alleged shoddy investigations and uncooperative communication and, in particular, for disregarding leads the family discovered in 2006. Funds generated from the sale of the documentary were donated to the Tim King Fund, designated to help abused children and support activities for Birmingham children.

=== DNA tests of hair ===
Forensic DNA tests conducted in 2012 showed that hair found on the seat of Sloan's car and on the bodies of Stebbins and King were a match and came from the same unknown man. The hair DNA does not match Sloan, but implicates someone he knew or to whom he lent his car.

=== Later developments / 2012 case reopening ===
In 2013, an anonymous informant reported a blue AMC Gremlin buried in a farm field now being developed in Grand Blanc. Police are investigating the Gremlin for ties to the crime, as King was last seen in a blue Gremlin. However, in a 2017 interview, Timothy King's brother Chris recalled seeing the blue Gremlin still parked in the lot when searching for Timothy hours after his abduction. Contemporary police records indicate that investigators instead focused on a blue or dark-colored Pontiac LeMans or Pontiac Tempest as a vehicle of interest in the case.

==== "Jeff" ====
In 2005, an unidentified man, who would later emerge to become a common figure in the case and has been referred to by the alias of "Jeff", was reminded of a relationship he had in 1977 with an acquaintance. In an interview given to Oakland County investigators in 2010, Jeff informed them of atypical observations and actions while driving and conversing with the acquaintance, such as taking him to buildings where satanic rituals were allegedly performed. The acquaintance navigated through lesser-known routes associated with the case with ease. The acquaintance also spoke of details written in "Allen's" letter (see above). Jeff requested information about the "Allen" letter to help confirm his suspicions but was denied.

In 2010, Jeff gave a recorded interview to Oakland County investigators and prosecutor Jessica Cooper to present evidence pertaining to the investigation. Jeff claimed to have tried to approach Cooper with his findings and to convince her to place the case under the jurisdiction of the Department of Justice. The department was already involved through the FBI and through resources such as the ViCAP database. Cooper dismissed his suggestions, and, as there was no new evidence presented, his request to inspect the "Allen" letter was denied. Cooper described the interview as "a rambling statement outlining a theory that the Oakland County Child Killer abductions and murders were related to pagan holidays, the lunar calendar, and Wiccan rituals".

Jeff proceeded to correspond with Deborah Jarvis, mother of victim Kristine Mihelich, and investigative journalists such as Bill Proctor and Heather Catallo in 2010. He claimed that he was among a team of a dozen investigators involved with the case and could identify the perpetrator of the crimes but refused to indicate for which law enforcement division he worked. Jeff claimed to have invested 10,000 hours into the investigation over several years but was reluctant to release his results, as he doubted the competence of Wayne and Oakland County investigators. In a press release email, Jeff indicated possible meddling by Cooper and other reasons as to why he had not made his investigation public. According to Paul Hughes, an attorney representing Jarvis, Jeff's investigation discovered the murderer. However, according to Hughes, Jeff refused to identify the culprit unless the authorities divulged crucial information, which Jeff requested during the initial interviews in 2010. Jeff wanted to positively confirm the identity of his suspect using the police evidence before proceeding further.

In 2012, Jeff presented his findings to a select group of Detroit journalists on Hughes' cell phone. To preserve his anonymity, he insisted that his phone interview with Hughes not be recorded. According to Jeff, there were a total of approximately 11–16 victims, significantly more than the four officially confirmed victims. Based on this information, Hughes attempted a lawsuit against the Oakland County authorities for $100 million, citing mishandling of the investigation and demanding Cooper's resignation. The lawsuit alleged a cover-up conspiracy and obstruction.

==== Arch Sloan ====
In February 2019, the Investigation Discovery channel aired a two-part, four-hour documentary about the killings. At this same time, WXYZ-TV investigative reporter Heather Catallo announced that a key suspect, convicted child sex offender Arch Edward Sloan, had failed a polygraph test when he was interviewed by the Oakland County Child Killer Task Force in 2010 and 2012. In 2012, new DNA technology found that Sloan's car contained hair with the same mitochondrial profile as evidence found on the victims; however, it is not Sloan's.

Sloan died on June 12, 2026, having given detectives "new information" on the case hours before his death.

== See also ==
- List of homicides in Michigan
- List of fugitives from justice who disappeared
- List of serial killers in the United States

== Bibliography ==
- Barfknecht, Gary (1993). Unexplained Michigan Mysteries: Strange but True Tales from the Michigan Unknown. Davison: Friede Publications. ISBN 0-923756-05-1. OCLC 29187818.
- Keppel, Robert; Birnes, William (1995). The Riverman. Arrow Books. ISBN 0-0992-3311-8.
- McIntyre, Tommy (1988). Wolf in Sheep's Clothing: The Search for a Child Killer. Detroit: Wayne State University Press. ISBN 0-8143-1966-1. OCLC 17731672.
- Appelman, J. Reuben (2018). The Kill Jar: Obsession, Descent, and a Hunt for Detroit's Most Notorious Serial Killer. Gallery Books. ISBN 978-1507204023. OCLC 1005098024.
