= Marc Harris =

Panamanian accountant

- Born: c. 1965 (age 60–61)
- Occupation: Accountant
- Known for: Tax fraud

Marc Matthew Harris (born c. 1965) is an accountant who was formerly active in the field of offshore financial services. At one time he claimed that his firm, The Harris Organisation, had funds under management of $1 billion and $35 million in capital, but the organization collapsed after being exposed as fraudulent in OffshoreAlert in 1998. In 2004, Harris was convicted in the United States on charges of money laundering and tax evasion. He renounced his American citizenship and became a Panamanian citizen in the 1990's.

== Early life and career ==
Harris was born around 1965. He graduated from North Carolina Wesleyan College aged 18 and received an MBA from Columbia University in 1985. He qualified as a certified public accountant in the United States but quickly left the Florida firm he joined. He started his own firm in Miami with a $5,000 advance on his credit card in December 1985 but his license was suspended by the Florida authorities in December 1990 for various "violations".

With Jerome Schneider, Harris set up banks in Montserrat that included, among others, the Allied Reserve Bank, Fidelity Overseas Bank, and First City Bank, but these were all closed down by the Montserrat authorities around 1988.

== Panama ==
In 1989 or 1990, Harris left the United States as a result of what he called U.S. Internal Revenue Service "persecution". He settled in Panama, renounced his U.S. citizenship, and became a Panamanian citizen. In order to operate in the offshore trust market, Harris bought the Trust Services firm from Robin Bailey and Derek Sambrook in 1995 but the two bought the firm back after becoming disillusioned with Harris's business practices.

He traded as The Harris Organisation and marketed his services online through the marc-harris.com and escapeartist.com websites, offering services such as second passports, offshore trusts, company formation, investments, asset protection and ancillary services. The firm used a Panama postal address but was incorporated in the British Virgin Islands. In 1998, Harris claimed that his firm had funds under management of $1 billion and $35 million in capital.

In March 1998, Jim Bennett, an offshore asset protection attorney, asked David Marchant, editor of the OffshoreAlert newsletter, to investigate Harris. Bennett had seen Harris speak in London at the Shorex offshore finance conference in London in 1997. Harris had already come to the attention of financial regulators in various countries by the time that Marchant published his findings in OffshoreAlert in March 1998, but Marchant's report was the first to show a complete picture of Harris's operation. Among other things, Marchant accused The Harris Organisation of being an insolvent Ponzi scheme. In April that year Harris responded by filing a $30 million libel claim against Marchant which Harris lost. In 2000, he also lost his appeal against the original ruling.

== Nicaragua and arrest ==
In 2002, Harris moved to Nicaragua, reportedly after things got difficult for him in Panama. In June 2003, he was arrested in Managua when he and his wife were en route to an immigration hearing. He was handed to U.S. Marshals who were waiting for him and flown to Miami to face charges of avoiding $6.2 million of excise tax along with alleged co-conspirators Aurelio and Joseph Vigna who the U.S. government argued were involved in the illegal import into the United States of the ozone-depleting refrigerant chemical Freon. Harris's role was to channel money through one of his trust companies. In 2004, he was convicted of money laundering and tax evasion, sentenced to 17 years in jail, and ordered to pay a fine of $27 million which is believed never to have been collected. IRS examination of Harris's records after the trial led to the prosecution of a number of Americans for tax evasion. He was released early, potentially due to health issues, in August 2016.

== Selected publications ==
- The Private Interest Foundation of Panama. Panama: Harris Publishing, 1998. ISBN 9962550513

== See also ==
- Adam Starchild
