= Sexual abuse scandal in New Orleans Boy Scout Troop 137 =

Former Scouting America troop and child sexual abuse ring

New Orleans Boy Scout Troop 137 was a Boy Scouts of America troop in which at least twenty-five boys aged eight to fifteen were sexually abused between June 1974 and September 1976.

The scoutmasters preyed upon children from unstable backgrounds and used them for child pornography and their own sexual pleasure, as well as pimping them out to pederasts in and outside of Louisiana. An investigation into the troop led to the arrests of at least nineteen men. By 1978, eleven men were convicted in the case, several of whom received lengthy prison sentences.

== History ==
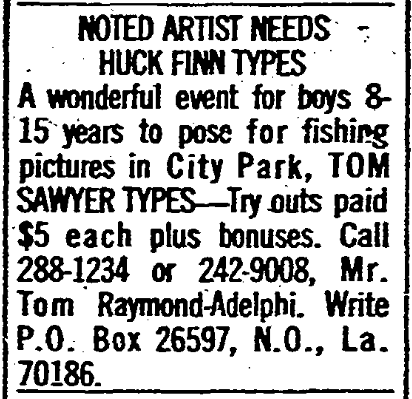
The help-wanted ad placed in The Times-Picayune in 1974 (Note: "Mr. Tom Raymond" refers to Raymond Thomas Woodall)

Troop 137 was founded in early 1974 in New Orleans East, Louisiana, by four men: Richard Stanley Halvorsen, Raymond Thomas Woodall Jr., (Note: Sometimes referred to as "Raymond A. Woodall") Harry Cramer, and Lewis Sialle. According to Sialle during his later testimony in court, the troop began with the intention to "provide [the men] with boys for their sexual pleasure". Prior to its founding, Halvorsen and Woodall had arrived in New Orleans from Coral Gables, Florida, where they were listed as maintenance men for the Adelphi Academies, an alternative school that operated as a front for boy prostitution. Peter Bradford, a co-owner of the Academies, was among those arrested for molesting the scouts in New Orleans. The first noted act of the group was on August 31, 1974, when Woodall and one of the group's alleged collaborators, a local painter named John Reed Campbell, placed an ad in The Times-Picayune seeking young "Huck Finn types" to pose for fishing photographs.

Woodall and Robert Lang, a committee member of Troop 137, also formed a New Orleans-based tour guide service in 1973. Tourists were provided with entertainment, lodging, food, and access to sex workers, later including underage boys. According to Woodall in a letter to The Times-Picayune, politicians from outside Louisiana were among their customers. Sialle testified that the service originally employed adult gay men but moved on to young boys to cut costs.

The troop leaders targeted boys from unstable backgrounds, often by infiltrating organizations such as child welfare services and Big Brothers Big Sisters of America. Halvorsen and recruiter Richard Pass' modus operandi was to entice boys and their families with gifts such as motorcycles or guitars, for them to then be placed in the Adelphi Academies and Troop 137. Pedophiles from outside of New Orleans would travel to the city to sexually assault the boys, and they were also taken out of state for sexual purposes. The boys were used for child pornography, which was photographed and filmed by the troop leaders. This abuse material was then shared by the group and their associates to pedophile networks spanning the country.

Additionally, applications had been drawn up by the men to establish boys' homes, but the plan was not carried out.

According to their testimonies in court, the victims—some of whom were not members of the troop—would be taken on trips (such as to Pontchartrain Beach) and would spend weekends at the scoutmasters' homes, where they would engage in sex acts with adult men.

== Investigation ==
A copy of Boys' Life, a magazine issued by the Boy Scouts of America, was on a table in one of the pornographic photos and was a key piece of evidence in connecting the crimes to Troop 137.

On August 23, 1976, a conveyor belt broke down at Fotomat, a commercial film developer. The regional manager notified police after a series of photographs, sent by Harry Cramer, was found to contain two adults, later determined to be Woodall and Cramer, sexually assaulting a male child.

On August 31, the troop disbanded after the scoutmasters were made aware of an investigation being underway. Despite this, most sources claim that the abuse continued into September.

On September 10, Halvorsen, Woodall, and 18-year-old Lloyd Schwegmann were arrested. At their homes, detectives confiscated index cards listing the names and home addresses of children in several states. They also seized child pornography of fifteen different victims and magazines titled "Boys For Sale", "Naked Boyhood", and "Young Boys and Oral Sex". Halvorsen and Woodall were charged with multiple sex offenses, while Schwegmann was charged with contributing to the delinquency of minors and possession of the drug Tuinal. Cramer, Pass, and Lang fled and were apprehended soon after.

In the following months, the scope of the investigation widened. By May 1977, nineteen men were charged with abuse in relation to Troop 137. According to then-district attorney of Orleans Parish, Harry Connick, the clients had abused other children in thirty-four different U.S. states, as well as in England. Contacts of the troop to pederasts abroad, as far as Saudi Arabia, were discovered, as were filing cabinets full of letters dating back to 1956 of men requesting access to boys.

After his correspondence and sex abuse material were discovered in the Troop 137 investigation, Claudius Vermilye, an Episcopal priest running a boys' home in Tennessee, was apprehended in November 1976. Chicago-based child pornographer and sex trafficker John David Norman's name also appeared in Halvorsen's address book.

=== Convictions ===
Mug shot of Woodall

Lang pleaded guilty to a conspiracy charge in 1976 and was given a suspended sentence. He then moved to Saudi Arabia, where he was a self-described businessman.

In March 1977, Schwegmann, a former Boy Scout who was among those first arrested in the case, was sentenced to six months in jail for contempt of court after he refused to answer questions about Troop 137.

Woodall was committed to the East Louisiana State Hospital prior to trial for "severe depression and suicidal tendencies". Charged with eleven counts of aggravated crimes against nature, he received a 75-year prison sentence to be served at Angola in May 1977. He died behind bars in 2013.

In 1977, Sialle pleaded guilty to two counts of crimes against nature and received a lighter sentence of seven years in prison after corroborating statements in court given by victims.

In July 1977, a 38-year-old medical technician named Larry Joe Phillips was sentenced to 30 years in prison for two counts of aggravated crimes against nature committed against a 13-year-old boy. Also in July, Hugh Scott Mellor, a wealthy real estate manager from Boston, pleaded guilty to committing an aggravated crime against nature involving a 13-year-old boy. He was sentenced to five years in prison.

In August 1977, Halvorsen was sentenced to 30 years in prison on five counts of indecent behavior and eleven counts of aggravated crimes against nature. He received a lighter sentence than Woodall due to his remorse during trial. The same month, Cramer was sentenced to serve 45 years at Angola on twenty-six counts of aggravated crimes against nature. Also in August, Pass was sentenced to 40 years in prison.

In October 1977, temporary assistant scoutmaster Nelson Boan was found guilty of five counts of aggravated crimes against nature for acts he committed against several boys. He was sentenced to 25 years in prison.

In March 1978, Robert Bernard Mallers, a Californian millionaire, received two concurrent sentences of nine years and seven and a half years in prison for the rape of a nine-year-old boy in the home of Halvorsen.

=== John Reed Campbell ===
In July 1977, John Reed Campbell was charged with sex crimes in connection to the Troop 137 investigation; (Note: Campbell was charged with "conspiracy to commit aggravated crime against nature" and "indecent behavior with a juvenile". His home was also among those raided in September 1976.) however, he had disappeared in September 1976 following the arrests of Halvorsen, Woodall, and Schwegmann.

In February 1980, district attorney Harry Connick requested assistance from the FBI in locating Campbell. He was found two months later in Yuma, Arizona, but claimed that he was unaware of any charges against him and stated that he was in Arizona for business purposes. The charges against him were dropped in July 1982.

Connick was accused by Sialle during a 1979 court testimony of being romantically involved with Campbell, who had assisted him in an election campaign. Connick denied the allegation. However, Campbell and Connick had been acquainted since 1969, and Campbell described himself as a personal friend of Connick. Campbell also claimed that he was an early informant in the case and that Connick had allowed him to leave Louisiana in 1976, following a meeting with Connick and his top aide that took place hours after the raid of his home. Connick stated that although the meeting had occurred, he was, at the time, unaware of Campbell's sex crimes. The appearance that Connick had allowed Campbell to escape justice was a brief controversy in New Orleans.

=== Disappearance of Richard C. Jacobs ===
Bostonian Richard C. Jacobs (born 1936) was a multimillionaire businessman, heir to his father's Jet Spray Cooler, Inc. fortune, and a former part-owner of the New England Patriots. In 1977, he was facing a maximum of 15 years' imprisonment for allegedly abusing members of the troop. One day before his trial, he jumped bail and was never seen again.

In 1988, the Massachusetts SJC ruled that Jacobs was still alive following his mother's attempt to collect $1 million in life insurance. In court, a lawyer for Guardian Life pointed to Jacobs having already fled charges of child molestation in London in 1974. He added: "His car's never been found, there's no evidence at all, anywhere, that he's dead".

== See also ==
- Boy Scouts of America sex abuse cases
