= Clifford L. Linedecker =

American journalist and writer

- Spouse: Yang Soon (Junko) Ri (m. 1957)
- Writing career
- Genres: Thriller, true crime, realistic fiction
- Notable works: The Man Who Killed Boys; Children in Chains; My Life with Elvis
- Website: www.penguinrandomhouse.com/authors/2003083/clifford-l-linedecker/

Clifford L. Linedecker is an American investigative journalist and author of true crime books.

== Early life ==
Linedecker was born in Plymouth, Indiana, and graduated from Plymouth High School in 1950. He wrote for the high school newspaper. He joined the U.S. Navy in 1952, and was stationed on a small island. Some officers decided to address the low morale by assigning him and four other men to start a newspaper. While stationed in Yokohama, Japan, Linedecker met Yang Soon (Junko) Ri. They were married in 1957.

== Career ==
Linedecker's first job was as a reporter for the LaPorte Herald-Argus in La Porte, Indiana. He later worked for many years as an editor at the National Examiner. He worked for a series of newspapers, including the Terre Haute Tribune, The Times in Hammond, the Fort Wayne News-Sentinel, the Times-Union in Rochester, N.Y., and The Philadelphia Inquirer.

Linedecker's first published book was Psychic Spy, one of three books he wrote before taking up true crime writing. The three included the bestseller, My Life with Elvis, co-authored with Elvis Presley's former secretary Becky Yancey.

His first true crime book was The Man Who Killed Boys, an account of serial killer John Wayne Gacy. It was published in 1980.

Linedecker and his wife retired to Lantana, Florida.

== Books ==
=== True crime books ===
- The Man Who Killed Boys (1980)
- Children in Chains (1981)
- Night Stalker (1991)
- Smooth Operator: The True Story of Seductive Serial Killer Glen Rogers. New York: St. Martin's Paperbacks (1997)
- Babyface Killers: Horrifying True Stories of America's Youngest Murderers (1999)

=== Other books ===
- My Life with Elvis, co-authored with Becky Yancey
- Psychic Spy: The Story of an Astounding Man
