= Most Evil =

American forensics TV program (2006–2015)

- Starring: Michael Stone; Kris Mohandie
- Narrated by: Tim Hopper, Neil Dudgeon
- Country of origin: United States
- No. of seasons: 4
- No. of episodes: 38

Original release
- Network: Discovery Channel
- Release: July 13, 2006 – April 7, 2008
- Network: Investigation Discovery
- Release: December 7, 2014 – February 26, 2015

Most Evil is an American forensics television program on Investigation Discovery, first aired in 2006, presented by forensic psychiatrist Michael H. Stone of Columbia University during the program's first three seasons, and by forensic psychologist Kris Mohandie during its fourth season. On the show, the presenter rates murderers on a scale of evil that Stone himself has developed. The show features profiles on various murderers, serial killers, and mass murderers of various degrees of psychopathy. The series initially ran for three seasons, from 2006 to 2008, and was later revived for a fourth season, from 2014 to 2015.

== Episodes ==
=== Season 1 (2006) ===
No. in season	Title	Original release date
1	"Killer Lies"	July 13, 2006
Stone considers those killers who deceive to be twice as evil. The more wicked the crime and the more premeditated the deceit, the higher they are placed on his scale. Susan Smith killed her sons by driving into a lake and letting them drown. She later claimed that someone hijacked her car and kidnapped the two boys. John List killed his entire family and went on to start a new life. Nathaniel Bar-Jonah was accused murdering a 10-year-old boy in Great Falls, Montana. He is now serving life imprisonment for molesting two other boys. Dennis Rader was the notorious "B.T.K. killer", who lived a double life, leading the police to not view him as a possible suspect until 30 years later. Note: That was official by the time of this episode, Bar-Jonah died of a heart attack two years later.
2	"Cold-Blooded Killers"	July 20, 2006
Stone studies four serial killers. Ted Bundy raped and killed 20+ women in the 1970s throughout the U.S. Gary Ridgway killed 49 women, usually dumping their bodies in the Green River, giving him the name the "Green River Killer". Tommy Lynn Sells is convicted of one murder, but he confessed to many more. So far 11 of them were confirmed following his death sentence. John Wayne Gacy was responsible for 33 sadistic murders while maintaining the face of a model citizen. Note:: Sells was eventually executed in 2014.
3	"Murderous Women"	July 27, 2006
Over 90% of murders are committed by men. But what motivates the women who are driven to kill? Jean Harris murdered her ex-lover, Herman Tarnower as a fit of rage. Marybeth Tinning killed all her nine children in a span of 14 years, for attention and recognition. Gwendolyn Graham and Cathy Wood were both nurses in Grand Rapids, Michigan who worked together in killing 5 elderly patients. Aileen Wuornos was a drifter who killed 7 men by shooting them. Theresa Knorr tortured her six children, murdering two of her daughters in Auburn, California. Note:: the original version of the episode also features an interview by Pat Brown with Jessica Schwarz, who murdered her stepson in West Palm Beach, Florida
4	"Partners in Crime"	August 10, 2006
Stone studies people who worked together in mostly murder cases. Paul Bernardo and Karla Homolka killed 3 people in Ontario, while they were married. Ian Brady and Myra Hindley committed one of Britain's notorious and horrific murder cases. David Parker Ray lured women into his "Toybox" where he tortured and murdered along with his fiancée Cindy Hendy. Despite this he was never tried for a murder. Leonard Lake and Charles Ng built a bunker to execute a savage plan. They claimed the lives of at least 11 people.
5	"Psychotic Killers"	August 17, 2006
Stone studies three killers with recorded psychotic symptoms to understand their atrocities. In each case, they claim they are unaware of what's real or imagined. Ed Gein killed two women, and was official to be wearing his deceased mother's clothing. Arthur Shawcross was sentenced for killing two children. Only to be released and kill 11 women. He has claimed to have had an abusive childhood which led to a possibility of psychosis issues such as hallucination. Gary Heidnik killed two women and kept four others as prisoners in his Philadelphia basement. He has been reported to have mental difficulties as he was brain-damaged at a young age by an abusive father.
6	"Deadly Desires"	August 24, 2006
Stone explores three so-called "Lust killers" to find out how their desires form and what drives them to carry out their Deadly fantasies. Jerry Brudos killed four women in his own workshop at Salem, Oregon. It is reported that he had a lethal desire for his victim's clothing. Jeffrey Dahmer drugged and killed 17 men then raped their corpses, and would save some of them later for a meal. Westley Allan Dodd molested children for years ever since he was a teenager, but eventually his sexual desires turned into something more brutal. He killed three boys in Vancouver, Washington before his capture.
7	"Science of Murder"	August 31, 2006
Stone studies killers who are great subjects behind the science found in Criminal Activity. Charles Whitman killed both his wife and mother, and then went to the University of Texas where he shot to death 16 more people from the campus' highest tower before being gunned down. He was reported to have a brain tumor which might have been the motive behind his violent actions. Edward Gingerich claimed to be possessed by the devil, after he brutally murdered his wife. He was the first amish person ever convicted of a homicide. Harold Shipman was a respected doctor in a small town. Until the police discovered he killed hundreds of patients over the years.
8	"Up Close"	September 7, 2006
Stone goes through the concept of "Up Close" which means interviewing a suspect or perpetrator of a murder, and getting into their side of the crime, by interviewing three already studied criminals: Tommy Lynn Sells, Cindy Hendy, and Nathaniel Bar-Jonah.

=== Season 2 (2007) ===
No. in season	Title	Original release date
1	"Jealousy"	August 12, 2007
What happens when a jealous lover turns into an enraged killer? Stone studies killers that were motivated by jealousy. Augustine Garcia killed his former partner on her wedding day in Ridgefield, New Jersey. Samuel Collins killed his wife in Biddeford, Maine after discovering she was unfaithful throughout their ten years of marriage. Clara Harris killed her husband, after discovering he was having an affair with someone else. Andrew Cunanan believed his former partner and friend were having an affair. He drove from Minneapolis to Miami Beach while committing a killing spree, murdering 5 people. Note:: the episode also mentions Ira Einhorn and the murder of Phil Hartman
2	"Stalker"	August 19, 2007
What can explain this relentless drive, and what triggers violence in the mind of a stalker? Stone is exploring four cases of notorious stalkers. Richard Farley was fired from his company for sexually harassing a female employee. He would eventually return to the workplace killing 7 workers and injuring another four. Robert John Bardo shot and killed actress Rebecca Schaeffer at her California apartment. He has been stalking her since the first time he saw her in a film. Mark David Chapman shot and killed musician John Lennon at his apartment. He worshiped the Beatles until he turned against them based on his fanatic religious background. Gerald Atkins wanted to marry a woman he met at a Wixom, Michigan bar. When she rejected him, he believed this decision was influenced by her colleagues. He eventually shot-up the jewelry store, killing the manager and wounding three other people.
3	"Delusional"	August 26, 2007
Stone studies killers with delusional minds. Herbert Mullin killed 13 people, because of delusional thoughts of earthquakes, which in reality were only headaches due to his constant drug abuse. Diana Dial mindset shifted as she believed she was being persecuted by Nazis. Despite being diagnosed as a schizophrenic, she stopped taking her pills and her family abandoned her by sending her to a new home in Austin, Texas. When she believed her roommate is secretly poisoning her, she snapped and killed him. As Eric Beishline's cocaine intake became worse as he believed he was being followed. One day he broke into the home of an elderly woman in Troy, Missouri. He suffocated her with a chloroform rag, then robbed her house. Investigators suspected him of two other killings.
4	"Unsolved Cases"	September 2, 2007
Stone studies murder cases that for the most part are unsolved. The Lipstick killer was active in the Chicago area, leaving a notorious message in lipstick on one of the victims. William Heirens confessed to the three murders, but was he forced to do that? The "Black Dahlia" is one of the most notorious unsolved cases in American history. However, physician George Hodel was suspected. In 1994 James McVay, Jr. was found killed in his pickup truck at Fort Worth, Texas. His face was spray-printed blue, which left no DNA evidence. A witness said to have seen more than one car driving around McVay's truck, leaving the possibility that more than one person was involved in his murder.
5	"Cult Followers"	September 9, 2007
Stone unearths the psychology of persuasion to learn why cult members can become active participants in evil. Jeffrey Lundgren was a member of the Community of Christ church. He started a cult alongside a close friend, Ron Luff, following the beliefs that were said in the church. But, instead of turning his fellow members into faithful followers, he turned them into murderers. Charles Manson started what is still known as California's worst killing spree, with his so-called "Family", including "Charles "Tex" Watson. Jim Jones invited many who were part of his cult known as the "Peoples Temple" to Guyana, where they all drank Flavor-aid which contained poison, and a total of 918 died. This, according to Jones, was a form of sacrifice for God.
6	"Spree Killers"	September 16, 2007
Stone reveals the psychology behind spree killers. Martin Bryant was responsible for multiple shooting sites, killing 35 people in Tasmania. Charles Starkweather, along with his underage girlfriend Caril Ann Fugate, went-out a killing spree in Nebraska claiming 11 lives. Yusef Rahman shot and killed one person and injured three others in Riverhead, New York in a four-day spree. Seung-Hui Cho shot and killed 32 people at the Virginia Tech campus in Blacksburg, Virginia, and eventually committed suicide.
7	"Attention Seekers"	September 23, 2007
Stone profiles murderers whose need for glory and control led them to incredible evil. David Berkowitz terrorized New York City in the 70s as the "Son of Sam", killing 6 people before capture. The "Zodiac Killer" terrorized Northern California by killing five people and sending encrypted letters to the police. Terry Driver attacked two teenage Canadian girls and killed one of them. He left both taunting letters and phone calls to the police, for which he was eventually labeled the "Abbotsford Killer". Keith Jesperson traveled across the country, becoming known as the "Smiley Face Killer" as he enjoyed playing games with the FBI.
8	"Masterminds"	September 30, 2007
What lies at the intersection of evil and intelligence? Stone studies killers that are considered highly intelligent compared to others. While serving in a mental institute killing his grandparents, Edmund Kemper befriended his psychologist to be released early due to good behavior. A decade later he murdered seven women and soon his own mother. H.H. Holmes was not just a serial killer but also a successful con artist. Ted Kaczynski was a highly intelligent man who believed that technology was harmful to mankind. He decided to send letterbombs to Universities that worked on the development of computers and ended up killing three people, injuring dozens as the "Unabomber".
9	"Revenge"	October 7, 2007
Stone probes the science of revenge to profile revenge killers, looking for clues that might shed light on their motives. Coy Wayne Wesbrook discovered his ex-wife with a boyfriend at a party. Being enraged at the sight, he decided to shoot up the place, killing her and four others. Archie McCafferty was upset over the death of his infant son, so he decided to even it up by threatening to kill seven people.
10	"Cult Leaders"	October 14, 2007
Stone analyzes some of the 20th century's most deadly cult leaders. Shoko Asahara believed in the Apocalypse. To prove its existence, he set up a cult that was responsible for many terrorist attacks, one of which was the notorious "Tokyo subway sarin attack" in 1995. Adolfo Constanzo started a cult located on the Mexico–United States border, which was set up for both voodoo magicians and human sacrifice.

=== Season 3 (2008) ===
No. in season	Title	Original release date
1	"Manson"	January 31, 2008
Retrace the investigation of Charles Manson and how he convinced young, middle-class men and women -Susan Atkins, Charles "Tex" Watson, Leslie Van Houten, Patricia Krenwinkel- to commit unthinkable acts of violence.
2	"Madness"	February 7, 2008
Killers' minds make irrational connections that result in horrifying acts of evil. Michael Owen Perry believed that singer Olivia Newton-John was tormenting him throughout telepathy. He eventually murdered 5 members of his family. Joseph Kallinger thought that he was on a mission from God to kill all mankind. During his trial, Colin Ferguson showed signs of persecutory delusion. Michael McDermott claimed that he was trapped in purgatory, and only can earn a soul if he kills his colleagues. However, it was later determined that he was faking a mental illness.
3	"Schemers"	February 14, 2008
Liars and con artists use their intelligence to get away with murder; while deceiving their families, friends, and the public. Diane Downs blamed a hitchhiker for shooting her three children. In truth, she was the one who pulled the trigger. Michael Swango practiced a lethal brand by poisoning his patients. Randy Kraft used his charms to deceive his victims. John Edward Robinson appeared to be a devoted family man in Kansas City, Kansas, until the bodies of 8 women he murdered were eventually found. Stone visited Martha Ann Johnson in prison where she is serving a life sentence.
4	"Vampires/Cannibals"	February 21, 2008
Driven by desires and delusions, these criminals not only kill they also consume flesh and drink blood. Armin Meiwes prowled internet chat rooms, hunting for a “dinner guest”. Delusions told Richard Chase that he must drink blood. Andrei Chikatilo's childhood fuelled a psychotic mind, making him the worst killer in the Soviet Union history. Rod Ferrell twisted fantasy of being a vampire claimed two lives.
5	"Women"	February 28, 2008
Do women kill less than men, or does the stereotype of being the gentler sex enable them to get away with more heinous crimes? After her husband left her, Betty Broderick terrorized him for years. Then she killed him and his new wife. Dorothea Puente operated a boarding house in Sacramento, California, where she poisoned 7 residents. Judith Neelley and her husband kidnapped and killed two women for her sadistic desires. Stone met Latasha Pulliam at Dwight Correctional Center, who strangled her neighbor’s 6-year-old daughter. Note:: the episode also mentions Blanche Taylor Moore, Juana Barraza and Kristen Gilbert
6	"Redemption"	March 6, 2008
Stone explores the possibility for killers to reform and change their lives. Billy Wayne Sinclair shot down a man during a robbery. Karla Faye Tucker killed a sleeping couple with a pickaxe. Archie McCafferty sought revenge by killing three strangers. As a former gang member, Daniel Nieto unleashed violence in the streets of Los Angeles. All committed heinous crimes and all of them expressed remorse and claimed to have been changed.
7	"Gangs"	March 13, 2008
Gangs lure members with promises of respect, money, and power. From armed robbery to murder, they are responsible for some of the most brutal crimes. In the 1930s, the Philadelphia poison ring was responsible for at least 15 murders. For decades Richard Kuklinski served as a mafia assassin. Ismael Cisneros was a foot soldier of MS-13 in Fairfax, Virginia. When he learned that a female friend became an informant of the police, he stabbed her to death. Ervil LeBaron headed a group of polygamist Mormons, ordering them to kill his rivals. Stone met former career gangster Joseph Salcedo to learn more about gangs.
8	"The Killer's Brain"	March 20, 2008
What makes a murderer? Can malfunctions in the brain compel someone to extreme cruelty? Are killers born or are they made? Samuel Collins, Clara L. Harris, Diane Downs, David Berkowitz, Richard Chase, Edmund Kemper, Susan Atkins, Charles "Tex" Watson, Leslie Van Houten, Patricia Krenwinkel
9	"Face to Face"	March 27, 2008
Michael Stone uses face-to-face, one-on-one interviews to gain insight into the motives, methods, and minds of murderers. Coy Wayne Wesbrook, Ron Luff, Diana Dial, Daniel Nieto
10	"Tracking Killers"	April 7, 2008
Michael Stone examines the process involved in identifying and capturing vicious killers. Andrew Cunanan, Keith Jesperson, Black Dahlia Murderer

== Series return ==
On December 7, 2014, Investigation Discovery began airing new episodes with a new host, Kris Mohandie.

=== Season 4 (2014) ===
No. in season	Title	Original release date
1	"Manipulators"	December 7, 2014
Three master manipulators. Each committed acts of unspeakable evil. Glenn Helzer orchestrated brutal murders in the name of God. Sylvia White killed his husband and her four-year-old stepson in Kinston, North Carolina. Over a three-year period, Dean Corll and his accomplice Elmer Wayne Henley lured multiple young men to their death.
2	"Control Killers"	December 14, 2014
Control freaks seek to gain power through murder. When Ronald Gene Simmons lost his command over his family he snapped and went on a rampage. To show how well he handled emergency situations, Richard Angelo would poison his patients, killing many of them. Billy Wayne Coble was a domineering father, and cold-blooded triple murderer in Waco, Texas.
3	"Rage Killers"	December 21, 2014
Anything can set off a rage killer. Gerald Stano craved the company of women but lashed out when he felt he was being mocked. When Robert Lopez found a girlfriend in Manchester, New Hampshire, he flipped a switch between obsessive love and blind rage. Benjamin Atkins viciously strangled women who reminded him of his mother.
4	"Stone Cold Killers"	December 28, 2014
Stone cold killers attack without a moment's hesitation. Maksim Gelman stabbed random strangers throughout Brooklyn. Henry Lee Lucas was a necrophiliac who claimed to have killed hundreds. Joseph Paul Franklin believed his racist murders served a higher purpose.
5	"Sexual Deviants"	January 4, 2015
Sexual deviants are aroused by the act of murder. Gerard John Schaefer used his position as a trusted policeman to kidnap his victims. Richard Hooten was a serial rapist who went after his neighbors in Clarksville, Indiana. After strangling them, Wayne Adam Ford severed his victims' body parts to keep them as trophies.
6	"Fantasy Killers"	January 11, 2015
Fantasy killers imagine every aspect of their crime in detail. Daniel Conahan lured men into the Central Florida woods to torture them. Angela Sanford was a self-proclaimed witch who killed a man as part of a satanic ritual. Harvey Miguel Robinson stalked his victims then meticulously planned his attacks.
7	"Deceptive Killers"	January 16, 2015
Deceptive killers walk among us wearing a mask of innocence. Darci Pierce tricked everyone that she was pregnant. To cover up her lies, she killed an expectant mother and stole her unborn baby. Doyle Kelley was convicted of murdering two of his wives in Joplin, Missouri. Everyone thought that Kendall Francois was a gentle giant, until police found the eight bodies he'd hidden.
8	"Egocentric Killers"	January 23, 2015
Ego Maniac killers think only of themselves, and thus commit egregious crimes without remorse. Robert Ben Rhoades tortured hitchhikers in a specially designed chamber in the back of his cab. After his girlfriend get restraining order against him, Paul Devoe went on a cross-country killing spree claiming six lives. David Dowler poisoned his friends when he didn't get their attention.
9	"Attention Seekers"	January 30, 2015
The attention-seeking killer commits crimes for the spotlight it incurs. George Russell posed his victims in elaborate positions to make himself more noteworthy. Heriberto Seda jumped on the coattails of the famed Zodiac Killer. Terry Caylor claimed to have killed 27 men around San Luis Obispo, California, but only one was ever confirmed.
10	"Predators"	February 26, 2015
By their nature, killers with strong predatory instincts are preying on the most vulnerable victims. Jack Owen Spillman proved his bestiality by drinking one of his victim's blood. David Elliott Penton was the real-life bogeyman, who abducted and killed at least five children. Levi King ambushed two families and gunned down five people during a 24-hour rampage.

== Scale and criminals ==
Stone researched hundreds of killers and their methods and motives to develop his hierarchy of "evil". The scale ranges from Category 1, those who kill in self-defense, to the Category 22, serial torturer-murderers. Stone described the categories of the scale in his book The Anatomy of Evil, published in 2009. In a follow-up book, The New Evil: Understanding the Emergence of Modern Violent Crime, published in 2019, he and co-author Gary Brucato, a clinical psychologist and researcher, break down the individual categories of the scale in detail.

Neurologists, psychologists, and other forensic psychiatrists are interviewed on the show in an attempt to examine and profile the minds of notorious killers. Partial re-enactments are shown along with news footage, evidence, and reports from locals. Neurological, environmental, and genetic factors are examined to help determine what drives a person to kill. Background history and pre-meditation are considered when placing an individual on the scale of evil. The show indirectly deals with the concepts of morality and ethics.

Only criminals profiled on the show to be included below

Category	Criteria	People
01	Those who have killed in self-defense, and who are not murderous.	
02	Jealous lovers who committed a crime of passion, though egocentric or immature; they are not psychopaths.	Samuel Collins, Jean Harris
03	Willing companions of killers: submissive personality, impulse-ridden, with some antisocial traits.	Leslie Van Houten
04	Those who have killed in self-defense, but caused the aggression to themselves.	
05	Desperate persons who killed abusive relatives or other people, but lack significant psychopathic traits and are genuinely remorseful.	
06	Homicidal, impetuous and hotheaded individuals who acted impulsively, but far from psychopathic.	Robert John Bardo, Billy Wayne Sinclair, Coy Wayne Wesbrook, Daniel Nieto, Doyle Kelley
07	Highly narcissistic or psychotic persons who kill out of jealousy or hatred.	Marybeth Tinning, Mark David Chapman, Armin Meiwes, Diana Dial, David Dowler, Clara Harris, Michael Owen Perry
08	Non-psychopathic individuals filled with rage, who ended up killing when they lost control.	Charles Whitman
09	Jealous lovers with marked psychopathic traits, such as tendency to violent behaviour.	Betty Broderick, Ron Luff, Robert Lopez
10	Killers of people in the way, such as witnesses. Extremely egocentric, but not distinctly psychopathic.	Rod Ferrell, Susan Smith, Darci Pierce
11	Psychopathic killers of people in the way, specially close friends or family members.	Ismael Cisneros
12	Power-hungry psychopaths who killed so they could escape with their power intact.	Ervil LeBaron, Angela Sanford
13	Inadequate, rageful psychopaths whose rage or psychosis are the reason for their killings.	Ed Gein, Herbert Mullin, Martin Bryant, Karla Faye Tucker, Latasha Pulliam, Richard Angelo, Maksim Gelman, Yusef Rahman
14	Ruthlessly, self-centered schemers with machiavellian and psychopathic traits who kill to benefit themselves.	John List, Richard Farley, Diane Downs, Sylvia White, Herman and Paul Petrillo
15	Psychopathic cold-blooded spree killers or mass murderers which may or not be suicidal.	Andrew Cunanan, Charles Manson, Charles Starkweather, Susan Atkins, Charles "Tex" Watson, Patricia Krenwinkel, Colin Ferguson, Michael McDermott, Dorothea Puente, Archie McCafferty, Billy Wayne Coble, Benjamin Atkins, Paul Devoe, Jones' accomplices
16	Psychopaths committing multiple vicious acts, including depraved acts.	Gwendolyn Graham and Cathy Wood, Karla Homolka, Myra Hindley, Terry Driver, Theodore Kaczynski, Shoko Asahara, Michael Swango, Joseph Paul Franklin, Richard Hooten, Kendall Francois, Heriberto Seda, Levi King, Gerald Atkins, Eric Beishline, James McVey killers
17	Sexually perverse killers: Psychopaths prone to commit rape followed by murder. Torture is not their main interest.	Ted Bundy, Arthur Shawcross, David Berkowitz, Richard Chase, Aileen Wuornos, Wayne Adam Ford, Henry Lee Lucas, Gerald Stano, George Russell
18	Torture-murder psychopaths, sadistic but more focused on murder than torture.	Nathan Bar-Jonah, Gary Ridgway, Jerome Brudos, Keith Jesperson, Harvey Miguel Robinson, Terry Caylor, Glenn Helzer, Lipstick killer
19	Psychopaths driven to terrorism, subjugation and sadism in general.	
20	Psychotic murdering torturers who subject at least one of their victims to a fairly brutal torture.	Joseph Kallinger
21	Psychopaths obsessed with torture, they do not kill their victims but seek to abuse them in the worst way possible.	
22	Psychopathic torture-murderers, where both sexual and non-sexual sadism are the primary motive.	Tommy Lynn Sells, John Wayne Gacy, Dennis Rader, Theresa Knorr, Charles Ng, Leonard Lake, Paul Bernardo, Ian Brady, Gary Heidnik, David Parker Ray, Westley Allan Dodd, George Hodel, Jeffrey Lundgren, Edmund Kemper, H. H. Holmes, Adolfo Constanzo, John Edward Robinson, Andrei Chikatilo, Jeffrey Dahmer, Gerard John Schaefer, Judith Neelley, Richard Kuklinski, Daniel Conahan, Dean Corll, Ronald Gene Simmons, Jack Owen Spillman, David Elliot Penton, Robert Ben Rhoades, Jim Jones
