= Jack Olsen =

20th-century American journalist and author

- Born: John Edward Olsen; June 7, 1925; Indianapolis, Indiana, U.S.
- Died: July 16, 2002 (aged 77); Bainbridge Island, Washington, U.S.
- Occupations: Journalist, writer
- Writing career
- Subjects: True crime, sports and games
- Notable works: Son: A Psychopath and His Victims

Jack Olsen (June 7, 1925 – July 16, 2002) was an American journalist and author known for his crime reporting.

Olsen was senior editor-in-chief for the Chicago Sun-Times in 1954. He was Midwest bureau chief for Time and a senior editor for Sports Illustrated in 1961. He was also a regular contributor to other publications, including Fortune and Vanity Fair.

== Life and career ==
Olsen was born in Indianapolis. He was described as "the dean of true crime authors" by The Washington Post and the New York Daily News and "the master of true crime" by the Detroit Free Press and Newsday. Publishers Weekly called him "the best true crime writer around." His studies of crime are required reading in university criminology courses and have been cited in the New York Times Notable Books of the Year. In a page-one review, the Times described his work as "a genuine contribution to criminology and journalism alike."

Books by Olsen have sold 33 million copies. Several of his books examined the intersection of law and politics during the late 1960s and the early 1970s. They include Last Man Standing: The Tragedy and Triumph of Geronimo Pratt, (Pratt, a leader of the Black Panther Party, was declared innocent and released from prison after serving 25 years on the perjured testimony of a paid FBI informant), and The Bridge at Chappaquiddick examining the 1969 car crash and death that damaged Senator Ted Kennedy's political career. As Carl Bernstein and Bob Woodward write in their book All The President's Men, the book was one of several checked out of the White House library by E. Howard Hunt in the course of gathering information about Kennedy that could be used against him in the 1972 presidential campaign.

Many of Olsen's most popular works investigated the life histories of violent career criminals. These include studies of serial rapists such as Kevin Coe (Son: A Psychopath and his Victims) and George Russell, (Charmer), as well as serial killers (The Misbegotten Son about Arthur Shawcross and Hastened to the Grave: The Gypsy Murder Investigation). Discussing his lifelong interest in crime journalism, Olsen described a field trip that his college criminology class took to a prison:

"I'm 19 years old and we get inside, and I see all these guys who look just like me," he said. "I thought that criminals looked different." Explaining what triggers his determination, he said, "I start every book with the idea that I want to explain how this 7 or 8 pounds of protoplasm went from his mommy's arms to become a serial rapist or serial killer. I think a crime book that doesn't do this is pure pornography."

— Jack Olsen, quoted in the New York Times, 1993

Olsen's work had social conscience. At Sports Illustrated in 1968, he shook the athletic establishment with a series about black athletes and the discrimination they faced in professional and college sports.

Olsen's journalism was recognized with the National Headliner Award, the Chicago Newspaper Guild's Page One Award, the Washington State Governor's Award, and the Scripps-Howard Award. He was described as "the dean of true crime authors" by The Washington Post. His crime studies remain on required reading lists in university criminology courses. In his obituary, The New York Times described his work as "a genuine contribution to criminology and journalism alike."

Olsen lived on Bainbridge Island, Washington, and died on July 16, 2002.

== Books ==
=== Fiction ===
- Alphabet Jackson (1974)
- Massy's Game (1976)
- The Secret of Fire 5 (1977)
- Night Watch (1979)
- Missing Persons (1981)
- Have You Seen My Son? (1982)

=== Memoirs ===
- Over the Fence is Out (1961)
- The Pitcher's Kid (2002)

=== Nonfiction ===
- The Climb up to Hell (1962)
- Black is Best (1967)
- Silence on Monte Sole (1968)
- Night of the Grizzlies (1969)
- Aphrodite: Desperate Mission (1969)
- The Bridge at Chappaquiddick (1970)
- The Man with the Candy: The Story of the Houston Mass Murders (1974)
- Son: A Psychopath and his Victims (1983)
- Give a Boy a Gun (1985)
- Cold Kill (1987)
- Doc: The Rape of the Town of Lovell (1989)
- Predator: Rape, Madness, and Injustice in Seattle (1991)
- The Misbegotten Son (1993)
- Charmer (1994)
- Salt of the Earth (1996)
- Hastened to the Grave (1998)
- I: The Creation of a Serial Killer (1998)
- The Happy Face Killer (2008)

==== Games and sports ====
- The Mad World of Bridge LCCN 60-9675
- The Mad World of Bridge (Sports Illustrated)
- The Climb up to Hell (Harper & Row, 1962), 212 pp. – mountaineering LCCN 62-14542
- Bridge is My Life: Lessons of a Lifetime, 189 pp. – "by Chas. H. Goren, with Jack Olson" LCCN 65-22040
- Black is Best: The Riddle of Cassius Clay (Putnam, 1967) LCCN 67-10959; UK edition Cassius Clay: A biography (Pelham, 1967) – biography of Muhammad Ali

In 1967, Olsen released his authorized biography of Muhammad Ali, titled, Black is Best: The Riddle of Cassius Clay. From the book flap cover, Olsen, writes, "Cassius Clay is far more important as an American phenomenon of the 1960s than as a prizefighter. In his career as a boxer, he followed a traditional, even a stereotyped road to the top for a Negro, but his distortion of the American rags-to-riches story is peculiarly his own." Olsen spent a considerable amount of time around the boxer, subjecting him to several interviews over a two-year time period. Olsen also interviews family members, past training staff, doctors, promoters, and over twenty different sources who worked with Ali. Sports Illustrated called it "the best biography of a sports figure published to date".

- The Black Athlete: A Shameful Story; the myth of integration in American sports (Time-Life Books, 1968), 223 pp. LCCN 68-56365. OCLC 451880
- Fran Tarkenton. Better Scramble Than Lose (Four Winds, 1969) – "by Fran Tarkenton as told to Jack Olsen" LCCN 73-81706

==== History, politics, and sociology ====
- Night of the Grizzlies (1969)
- Silence on Monte Sole (1968)
- Aphrodite: Desperate Mission (1970)
- The Bridge at Chappaquiddick (1970)
- Slaughter the Animals, Poison the Earth, illustrated by Laszlo Kubinyi (Simon & Schuster, 1971) – LCSH Coyote; Predatory animals—control; Wildlife conservation LCCN 70-156160
- The Girls in the Office (1972)
- The Girls on the Campus (1974)
- Sweet Street: The Autobiography of an American Honkytonk Scene (1974)
- Last Man Standing: The Tragedy and Triumph of Geronimo Pratt (2000)

==== Crime ====
- The Man with the Candy: The Story of the Houston Mass Murders (1974)
- Son: A Psychopath and His Victims (1983) Edgar Award winner
- Give a Boy a Gun (1985)
- Cold Kill: The True Story of a Murderous Love (1987)
- Doc: The Rape of the Town of Lovell (1989) Edgar Award winner
- Predator: Rape, Madness, and Injustice in Seattle (1991) American Mystery Award winner
- The Misbegotten Son: A Serial Killer and His Victims (1993)
- Charmer: A Ladies' Man and his Victims (1994)
- Salt of the Earth (1996)
- Hastened to the Grave (1998)
- I: The Creation of a Serial Killer (2002)
