= Tinning (surname) =

Tinning is a surname. Notable people with the surname include:

- Iben Tinning (born 1974), Danish golfer
- Marybeth Tinning (born 1942), American serial killer
- Steen Tinning (born 1962), Danish golfer
