= The Anatomy of Evil =

2009 non-fiction book by Michael H. Stone

- Book cover release
- Author: Michael H. Stone
- Language: English
- Subjects: Forensic psychiatry Criminal profiling
- Publisher: Prometheus Books
- Publication date: July 28, 2009
- Publication place: United States
- Pages: 430
- ISBN: 978-1591027263

The Anatomy of Evil is a 2009 true crime psychological book by American forensic psychiatrist Michael H. Stone.

Stone uses his scale of evil to classify hundreds of violent criminals, exploring the neurological and psychological profiles of the offenders.

== Background ==
Stone was a Cornell University graduate and faculty member at Columbia University. He is known for developing a 22-level scale of evil that classifies the actions of complex criminals, contextualizing their psychological and personality disorders. In Stone's view, the worst criminals included those who committed torture, especially those who experienced sadistic arousal through torturing someone.

Between 2006 and 2008, Stone was the host and presenter of the Investigation Discovery show Most Evil, where he studied criminal cases from all over the world, especially the United States, classifying criminals according to his view on how premeditated and calculated their crimes were. Stone also interviewed some of these offenders for the show, including Nathaniel Bar-Jonah, Coy Wayne Wesbrook, Rod Ferrell, David Parker Ray's accomplice Cindy Hendy, and serial killer Tommy Lynn Sells, among others.

Stone died in New York City in December 2023 at the age of 90.

== Content ==
Stone partially based his scale of evil on Inferno by Dante Alighieri. In the first levels of the scale, Stone puts criminals whose actions were fueled by extreme anger, jealousy, or passion, with no premeditation and no psychopathic traits in the perpetrators. These chapters include the cases of Mark David Chapman, Jean Harris, and Susan Smith. In cases like Chapman and Smith, Stone considers them somewhat more evil due to the narcissistic nature of their crimes.

The book centers around two traits of personality that Stone considers to make criminals "more evil": narcissism and aggression, including lack of remorse and lack of empathy. In the mid-lower levels, Stone includes psychopathic schemers like John List, Betty Broderick, and Ed Gein, this last one being categorized as an inadequate and rageful psychotic killer who maintained a degree of functionality despite presenting psychosis. In the case of Broderick, Stone put her higher than usual for jealous killers due to the nature of Broderick's actions before the murders of her former husband and his new wife, especially the months-long harassment preceding the killings.

Stone continues through the mid-high level of the scale with cold-blooded spree killers like Andrew Cunanan, Diane Downs, and Richard Farley; and psychopaths who commit multiple depraved acts, including Dorothea Puente, Gerald Atkins, Ted Kaczynski, and Charles Manson and many of his followers, like Susan Atkins, Tex Watson, and Patricia Krenwinkel. In these levels, Stone considered Cunanan to be a jealous killer and pathological liar who was fueled by his narcissism. Stone analyzes Cunanan's childhood and how he saw himself as a better person than others.

At the top of Stone's scale, detailed in the book, are sadistic serial killers who torture their victims and continue with a pattern of murder for years or decades. The cases that Stone analyzes at the top of the scale range from Ted Bundy, Jeffrey Dahmer, and John Wayne Gacy to Dennis Rader and some other torturers who had much shorter spans of crimes or tolls of victims, including David Parker Ray and Westley Allan Dodd. Some of the women on top of the scale are torturers like Theresa Knorr and Gertrude Baniszewski.

Some chapters are specialized in certain dynamics, such as a chapter about crime involving family members, with the examples of brothers Lyle and Erik Menendez, and how charismatic psychopaths like Manson can make impressionable and non-psychopathic individuals commit heinous crimes. In these regards, Stone takes the examples of Krenwinkel and another Manson follower, Leslie Van Houten.

Other specific chapters deal with the issue of brain injuries and traumas that may cause criminal behavior. Stone also draws a line between crimes committed by individuals acting under the auspices of a government in wartime, such as the Nazi war crimes, and everyday citizens committing acts of torture and/or murder. In the final chapters, Stone differentiates between those who are "salvageable" and those who can never return to society, taking as an example of this last concept the case of New York serial killer Arthur Shawcross, whose release from prison before his serial murders was, in Stone's view, one of the "most unwarranted releases of a prisoner."

== Reception ==
The book received positive reviews from critics. Burr S. Eichelman of Psychiatry Online considered the book to be "very readable", further stating that it contains "frightening" details about crime. Eichelman notes as well how Stone treats the relationship between brain injury and criminal behavior and "functional" psychiatric disorders, such as some cases of schizophrenia. Concluding his review, Eichelman recommended the book to mental health professionals, especially those who are clinicians in the forensic field.

The website Meet New Books also gave The Anatomy of Evil a generally favorable review, recommending it too to true crime enthusiasts, while discouraging it to those who doubt subjective terms like "evil" and what the website considers "academic purists" in reference to some of Stone's biographical references to articles on Wikipedia.

The Library Journal said that the book fits the criteria for those trying to understand underlying motives for heinous crimes, such as neurological and psychiatric reasons, highlighting how Stone developed an etymology of evil. Monsters and Critics compared the book to a fiction thriller, remarking that these are actual cases of crime.

Academics, authors, journalists, and law enforcement officials also praised Stone's book. Academic Katherine Ramsland welcomed Stone's multiple factors to understand complex crime, while FBI profiler Roy Hazelwood said that Stone was the only one qualified to address the issues of the perverse depths of the most heinous criminal minds.

In August 2009, Stone stated in an interview with CBS News journalist Barry Leibowitz that he suffered from nightmares following his interview with Tommy Lynn Sells on death row in Texas. Stone details the nightmares in the book.

== Cited works ==
- Stone, Michael H. (2009). The Anatomy of Evil. NYC: Prometheus Books. ISBN 978-1591027263.
