= Marybeth Tinning =

American serial killer (born 1942)

- Born: Marybeth Roe; September 11, 1942 (age 84); Duanesburg, New York, U.S.
- Occupation: Former nursing assistant
- Spouse: Joe Tinning (m. 1965)
- Children: Barbara; Joseph; Jennifer; Timothy; Nathan; Michael B Angelo; Mary Frances; Jonathan; Tami Lynne
- Status: Released from incarceration on August 21, 2018
- Convictions: Second-degree murder July 17, 1987
- Penalty: 20 years to life

Details
- Victims: 9 (charged for 3)
- Date: December 20, 1985
- Weapon: Pillow (smothering)
- Imprisoned at: Bedford Hills Correctional Facility for Women in Bedford Hills, New York, U.S.

Marybeth Roe Tinning (born September 11, 1942) is an American murderer and suspected serial killer who was convicted in New York State of the murder of her ninth child, 4-month-old daughter Tami Lynne, on December 20, 1985. She is suspected to be similarly involved in the previous deaths of her eight children, all of which took place within the span of fourteen years.

The causes of death for Tinning's first eight children was initially thought to be genetic. Even when their sixth child, Michael – who was adopted and not of blood relation – died in 1981, authorities failed to open an investigation. Eventually, Schenectady County prosecutors had enough evidence – a laboratory test indicating death from asphyxia by suffocation – to charge Tinning in Tami Lynne's death. In July 1987, she was convicted of second-degree murder and sentenced to twenty years to life in prison. An appeal to the New York Supreme Court, arguing that her confession was coerced and there was insufficient evidence to convict her, was denied.

It is unclear if Tinning has ever been diagnosed with Munchausen syndrome by proxy (MSbP). Some believe that her pattern of behavior aligns perfectly with the Diagnostic and Statistical Manual of Mental Disorders, Fifth Edition's (DSM-5) Development and Course section on the disorder: "In individuals with recurrent episodes of falsification of signs and symptoms of illness and/or induction of injury, this pattern of successive deceptive contact with medical personnel, including hospitalizations, may become lifelong."

Tinning was incarcerated at Taconic Correctional Facility in Bedford Hills, New York. She was denied parole six times, but was granted parole at her seventh hearing in July 2018 and was released on August 21 of that year.

== Early life ==
Marybeth Roe was born to Ruth and Alton Lewis Roe on September 11, 1942, in the small town of Duanesburg, New York. There is little information available regarding her formative years. During some of this time, Marybeth's father was deployed overseas fighting in World War II, while her mother worked. Because both parents were frequently absent, Marybeth was occasionally shuffled among relatives; one elderly relative told her that she was an unwanted, accidental child. When her little brother reached adolescence, Marybeth told him, "You were the one they wanted, not me."

On completion of his active duty, Marybeth's father worked as a press operator in a nearby General Electric factory, which was the area's largest employer at the time. As an adult, she once claimed that her father abused her when she was a child. During a police interview in 1986, she told one investigator that her father had beaten her and locked her in a closet. During court testimony, she denied that her father had bad intentions. "My father hit me with a flyswatter," she told the court, "because he had arthritis and his hands were not of much use. And when he locked me in my room, I guess he thought I deserved it."

Marybeth was an average student at Duanesburg High School, from which she graduated in 1961. Following high school, she worked at various low-paying, unskilled jobs. She eventually settled on a job as a nursing assistant at Ellis Hospital in Schenectady, New York, ten miles north of Duanesburg.

== Marriage and poisoning ==
In 1963, Marybeth met Joseph Tinning on a blind date. They married in 1965 and their first child, Barbara, was born in May 1967, followed in January 1970 by Joseph Jr. In October 1971, Marybeth's father died of a heart attack.

In 1974, Joseph was admitted to the hospital with a near-fatal case of barbiturate poisoning. Later, he and Marybeth acknowledged that, when this incident occurred, their marriage was in heavy turmoil. This led to her placing barbiturate pills, which she took from a friend with an epileptic daughter, into Joseph's grape juice. He declined to press charges against her.

== Children's deaths ==
On December 26, 1971, the Tinnings' third child, Jennifer, was born at St. Clare's Hospital. She had hemorrhagic meningitis and multiple brain abscesses that had developed in utero. She lived for only a week and never left the hospital; she died on January 3, 1972.

Two weeks after Jennifer's death, Tinning took two-year-old Joseph Jr. to the Ellis Hospital emergency room in Schenectady, claiming that he had experienced a seizure and choked on his own vomit. Doctors found nothing wrong with him; he stayed in the hospital for several days under observation and was released. On January 20, a few hours after his release, Marybeth brought him back to the emergency room. He was dead on arrival, and his death was attributed to cardiac arrest.

On March 1, Marybeth rushed Barbara, now almost five years old, to Ellis Hospital because she had gone into convulsions. The next day, she died after being in a coma for several hours; her death was attributed to Reye syndrome.

On November 22, 1973, Tinning gave birth to son Timothy; on December 10, he was brought back to the hospital, dead. Tinning told doctors she found him lifeless in his crib. Doctors attributed his death to sudden infant death syndrome (SIDS). In March 1975, Tinning's fifth child, Nathan, was born; that autumn, he died in the car while out with her.

In August 1978, the Tinnings adopted newborn Michael; on October 29, Marybeth gave birth to her sixth child, Mary Frances. In January 1979, she rushed her to the emergency room, directly across the street from their apartment, saying she was having a seizure. The staff was able to revive her, reporting "aborted SIDS". A month later, Tinning returned to the hospital with her in full cardiac arrest; she was revived but had irreversible brain damage. She died two days later after being taken off life support. The Tinnings' eighth child, Jonathan, was born in fall 1979; he died in March 1980, after being kept on life support in Albany for four weeks.

In February 1981, Michael fell down the stairs and suffered a concussion. On March 2, Tinning took him to the doctor because he wouldn't wake up; he was already dead when she arrived. Since he was adopted, the long-suspected belief that the deaths in the Tinning family was of genetic origin was discarded.

Tami Lynne was born on August 22, 1985; on December 20, she died from asphyxia. On that day, the Tinnings were visited by Betsy Mannix of Schenectady County's Department of Social Services, and by Bob Imfeld of the Schenectady Police Department, concerning Tami Lynne's death.

The causes of the children's deaths were listed diversely, as natural, undetermined, or SIDS. Six autopsies of them took place after Tami Lynne's death, but they did not reveal any signs of abuse. Prior to Tami Lynne's death, there had been no suspicion found in the sequence of deaths. "There were so many of us in on it, I guess," said Dr. Robert L. Sullivan, Schenectady County's Chief Medical Examiner. "If anyone is negligent, I suppose I am. I probably should have said, 'There must be more to it than this.' But we all think, and don't do."

== Arrest and interrogation ==
Marybeth and Joseph Tinning were separately taken to the Schenectady Police Department for questioning about Tami Lynne's death. During the police interrogation, Marybeth signed a document confessing that she had murdered Tami Lynne, Timothy, and Nathan. She was arrested and charged with Tami Lynne's murder. Marybeth later claimed that her confession was made under duress, that police had threatened her, and that her repeated requests for a lawyer were denied.

Dr. Michael M. Baden, the lead forensic pathologist and member of the New York State Police's special forensic unit, determined that Tami Lynne's death was a result of smothering. After charging Marybeth in the killing, officials said that they considered the deaths of the eight other Tinning children to be suspicious.

Marybeth Tinning made her $100,000 bail payment and was released from custody until her trial date.

== Trial and conviction ==
Tinning's murder trial began in Schenectady County Court on June 22, 1987. Dr. Bradley Ford, Tami Lynne's pediatrician, testified on behalf of the prosecution, saying Tinning had dismissed his suggestion that, due to her previous children's deaths, she should install a specialized alarm device enabling the monitoring of the baby's breathing and heart rate. Two additional prosecution witnesses, Dr. Marie Valdes-Dapena of the SIDS Foundation, and Schenectady County medical examiner Thomas Oram, testified that they had concluded that Tami Lynne was smothered to death with a soft object.

After the six-week trial, the jury deliberated for twenty-three hours across three days, and found Tinning guilty of one count of second-degree murder. During their deliberation, jurors called for a read-back of the portions of Joseph's testimony recounting his wife's alleged confession to State Police. In his testimony, Joseph said that he had a five-minute conversation with his wife after the police questioning, and she told him, "I killed Tami". Marybeth was acquitted by the seven-man, five-woman jury of the count of "deliberately" causing the infant's death, but was convicted of murder by "depraved-indifference to human life" count. Tinning placed her hands over her eyes and sobbed quietly as the verdict was announced. Joseph later said, "I still think she's innocent." Judge Clifford Harrigan vacated Tinning's $100,000 bail, ordering that she be held in the Schenectady County Jail pending her sentencing trial.

Tinning received a sentence of twenty years to life in prison, five years shorter than the maximum penalty for the crime. She was imprisoned at the Bedford Hills Correctional Facility for Women. She appealed on the grounds that her confession was not voluntarily given and that her conviction was not supported by sufficient evidence. In 1988, her appeal was denied by the New York State Supreme Court's Appellate Division.

== Parole attempts ==
Tinning's first attempt at parole was in March 2007. At the parole board meeting, Tinning said, "I have to be honest, and the only thing that I can tell you is that I know that my daughter is dead. I live with it every day. I have no recollection and I can't believe that I harmed her. I can't say any more than that." Her parole was denied.

In late January 2009, Tinning went before the parole board for the second time. She stated "I was going through bad times" when she killed her daughter. The parole board again denied her parole, stating that her remorse was "superficial at best".

Tinning became eligible for parole again in January 2011. At that hearing, Tinning said: "After the deaths of my other children … I just lost it. (I) became a damaged worthless piece of person and when my daughter was young, in my state of mind at that time, I just believed that she was going to die also. So I just did it." For this hearing, Tinning was supported by people from Georgetown University Law Center and people she worked with in prison, who described her as the "most loving, most generous, caring person that they have ever met." She was denied parole due to her lack of remorse.

External videos
- CBS6 Albany (NY) Convicted child killer denied parole for 4th time, Feb 18, 2013

At her next appearance before the parole board, in 2013, when questioned about Tami Lynne's murder, she said "It's just — I can't remember. I mean, I know I did it, but I can't tell you why. There is no reason." The parole board stated, "This was an innocent, vulnerable victim who was entrusted in your care as her mother, and you viciously violated that trust causing a senseless loss of this young life." The board then said "...discretionary release would so deprecate the severity of the crime as to undermine respect for the law, as you placed your own interest above those of society's youth."

Tinning's next opportunity for parole was in February 2015. The parole board again denied her release, finding that she continued to demonstrate no understanding or remorse for taking her child's life. She was denied parole for the sixth time in January 2017.

Tinning, 76, was released on parole on August 21, 2018, after serving 31 years. Her husband, Joseph, who had supported her throughout her imprisonment, was present for her release. As part of her release, Tinning was ordered to remain under parole supervision for the rest of her life. A Department of Corrections spokesperson stated Tinning lives in Schenectady County. She has a curfew and must attend domestic violence counseling.

== In popular culture ==
Books

MOM: The Killer (2011), written by detective Mark Gado, probes the mind of Marybeth Tinning and the neglect and unsolved deaths of her children.

Investigative author Joyce Egginton details the case in her book, From Cradle to Grave: The Short Lives and Strange Deaths of Marybeth Tinning's Nine Children (1990).

Unnatural Death, Confessions of a Forensic Pathologist (1989), authored by Michael M. Baden with Judith Adler Hennessee, provides a complete first-person account of Baden's career in forensic pathology and addresses his findings of Tinning's crimes.

Television

The Home Box Office (HBO) network reported the Tinning case on an episode of the crime documentary series Autopsy sub-titled Autopsy - Confessions of a Medical Examiner (1994). After the passing of the ninth child Dr. Michael Baden requests the files of all the children's autopsy reports. His findings finally bring Tinning to justice; he clearly reflects his analysis of her history as being in-line with Munchausen syndrome by proxy (MSBP).

The Investigation Discovery network covered Tinning's case in the forensic series Most Evil sub-titled Most Evil - Murderous Women, Season 1; Episode 3. In the episode, forensic psychiatrist Michael H. Stone, probes into what motivates women who kill. Tinning's case depicts one of the striking differences between male and female killers. In this episode, Dr. Michael Stone, forensic psychologist, Columbia University uses his own mental health scale from 1-22, with 22 being the most dangerous ranking. Dr. Stone's assessment of Tinning is diagnosed at Level-7: Highly Narcissistic & Attention-Seeking. He outlines, in detail, how he reaches his assessment leading to Tinning's ranking.

The Investigation Discovery network released another episode, via the documentary drama series Deadly Women, disclosing the tragedies that each of her children experienced. The episode is sub-titled Deadly Women - Sacrifice Their Blood, Season 5; Episode 9. Initially the local community seeks to understand and show compassion to her. The community's sympathy turns to bitterness and calls out to authorities for action, when she goes one step too far with her ninth child's death.

== See also ==
- Marie Noe is an American woman convicted in 1999 of murdering eight of her children between 1949 and 1968.
- Waneta Hoyt was an American serial killer who was convicted of killing all five of her children between 1965 and 1971.

General:

- List of serial killers in the United States
