= George Russell (serial killer) =

American serial killer (born 1958)

George Waterfield Russell
- Born: George Waterfield Russell Jr. April 1958 (age 68); Florida, U.S.
- Other names: "The Charmer" "The East Side Killer" "The Bellevue Killer"
- Convictions: Aggravated first degree murder x2 First degree murder x1
- Penalty: Life imprisonment x2

Details
- Victims: 3
- Span of crimes: June 28 – August 31, 1990
- Country: United States
- State: Washington
- Date apprehended: September 12, 1990
- Imprisoned at: Clallam Bay Corrections Center, Clallam Bay, Washington

George Waterfield Russell Jr. (born April 1958), known as "the Charmer", is an American thief and serial killer responsible for the murders of three women in Seattle over the summer in 1990. After killing his victims, he would mutilate and have sex with the corpses, leaving the bodies posed in bizarre positions at the crime scene. For his crimes, he was sentenced to two life imprisonment terms.

== Early life ==
Born in Florida in April 1958, to Joyce and George Waterfield Russell Sr., George's parents separated when he was still an infant, with his mother moving with him to Mercer Island, Washington, to live with her new husband. At the age of 16, he was forced to live with his stepfather who later on remarried to another woman. While living with them, he developed an inappropriate fascination with his stepmother. He started to spy on her, and for that he was kicked out the house. Later on he lived with his aunts.

Throughout his childhood and early adulthood, Russell often had scrapes with the law, mostly involving thefts and burglaries. In 1971, he got into trouble for truancy. Rather than a punishment, he was given an opportunity to work at the Mercer Island Police Station. He later used this to make women feel comfortable around him. He frequented cocktail lounges around Seattle in search of hook-ups. However, he did not take rejection well. After an incident where he impersonated a police officer, he was banned from a club. Not long after this, he committed his first murder. In 1987, he was officially diagnosed with antisocial personality disorder.

== Murders ==
Between June and August 1990, Russell sexually assaulted and murdered three women. In each case, he horribly mutilated and violated the corpses, posing them in various grotesque positions before leaving the crime scene.

- Mary Anne Pohlreich (27), a resident of Redmond. Pohlreich's nude body was found behind a Bellevue restaurant's parking lot on June 23. She had been strangled, with her arms and legs crossed as if put in a coffin and her eyes covered with a plastic top.
- Carol Beethe (35), originally from Kirkland. Beethe's body was found in her bed at her Bellevue apartment on August 9. Her head had been beaten in, and she had bite marks on her arms and a plastic wrap over her head. Her legs were spread facing the front door with a shotgun pointed inwards towards her vagina. She was discovered by her daughter, who, during the night, noticed that somebody was searching through the house rooms with a flashlight before disappearing.
- Andrea 'Randi' Levine (24), also from Kirkland. Levine was found in her bed at her apartment Kingsgate on August 31. She had been stabbed many times and had her skull bashed in. Her killer shoved a sex toy down her throat and placed the book More Joy of Sex in her left hand. A distinctive ring she always wore was also found to be missing.

== Trial and imprisonment ==
On September 12, Russell was arrested as a suspect in the murders. Aside from semen samples and fiber pieces matching the truck he drove on the night of Beethe's murder, it was discovered that Russell had given Levine's ring to another woman, claiming that he had bought it from a street vendor in Canada. That ring was later found at a pawn shop. Russell pleaded not guilty to all charges, and when questioned in telephone interviews, he admitted to having books on Ted Bundy, but denied being a fan of his. In spite of his claims, he was found guilty of the three murders in October 1991 by Justice Patricia Aitken, showing no emotion when the sentence was read out. At the time, his brutal killings were compared with the then-unsolved murders of five college students in Gainesville, Florida, which were later linked to Danny Rolling. In November 1991, Russell was found guilty by a jury of one count of first degree murder, and two counts of aggravated first degree murder. George Russell was given two life imprisonment terms plus 28 years.

== In popular culture ==
Russell's story was detailed in Jack Olsen's 1995 book titled Charmer: A Ladies' Man and his Victims. Russell's case was also examined in Serial Violence: Analysis of Modus Operandi and Signature Characteristics of Killers by Robert D. Kepler and William J. Birnes. The case was dramatized in multiple Investigation Discovery television shows, including: Dead of Night, Secrets of the Morgue, City Confidential, and Murder By Numbers. He was analyzed in Most Evil, where he was ranked at 17 out of the 22 level scale. The case was examined by the television series The New Detectives in an episode named Stranger than Fiction. The case was also covered by Oxygen Network original series Mark of a Killer in the episode named "The Charmer".

== See also ==
- Danny Rolling
- List of serial killers in the United States
- Ted Bundy

== Bibliography ==
- Olsen, Jack (November 1, 1995). Charmer: A Ladies' Man and His Victims. Avon. ISBN 0380716011.
- Keppel, Robert D (2009). Serial Violence: Analysis of Modus Operandi and Signature Characteristics of Killers. CRC Press. ISBN 978-1-4200-6632-6.
