= Wayne Adam Ford =

American serial killer on death row

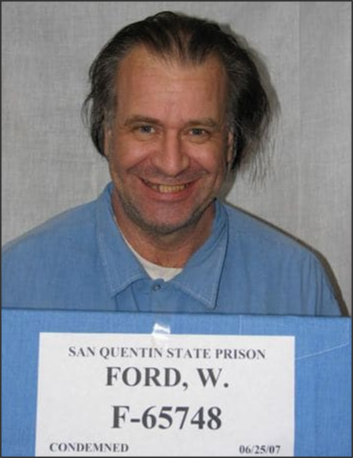
- Born: December 3, 1961 (age 64); Petaluma, California, U.S.
- Conviction: First degree murder with special circumstances (4 counts)
- Penalty: Death (de jure)

Details
- Victims: 4+
- Span of crimes: October, 1997 – November 3, 1998
- Country: United States
- State: California
- Date apprehended: November 3, 1998

Wayne Adam Ford (born December 3, 1961) is an American serial killer. Ford, a former long-haul truck driver, murdered four women from 1997 to 1998. He strangled them and dismembered three of his four victims. He turned himself in with a woman's breast in a bag in his coat pocket.

== Background ==
Ford was born in Petaluma, California, the second son of an American father and a German immigrant mother. His parents divorced when he was 10. He dropped out of high school and enlisted in the U.S. Marine Corps, where he served six years before being honorably discharged in 1985.

In November 1980, he was hit by a drunk driver, causing a head injury and leaving him in a coma for nine days. According to relatives, his personality drastically changed after the incident.

He had two marriages, both of which ended in divorce. In 1981 he forced his first wife, Kelly Pletcher to get an abortion in Napa, California.

Beginning in 1983, he had escalating problems at work with psychological decline, necessitating several hospitalizations. Ford was diagnosed with borderline personality disorder.

He had a series of scrapes with the law, including allegations of beating and robbing a sex worker in 1986 in Garden Grove, California. In 1990 he was arrested for animal cruelty, for which he served a brief jail sentence in San Clemente, California.

== Victims ==
Between 1997 and 1998, he murdered at least four women. At the time of the murders he lived in a trailer park in Arcata, California working as a long-haul truck driver.

- Kerry Ann Cummings (25) - Killed in 1997. Body was discovered on October 17, 1997, north of Eureka, California in the Ryan Slough near Humboldt Bay. Cummings was listed as a Jane Doe until June 2023, when a partnership between the Humboldt County Sheriff's Office Cold Case Unit, the California Department of Justice DNA Lab, and Othram Inc., identified her body after building a DNA profile and finding and confirming a genealogical match.
- Tina Renee Gibbs (26) - Killed on May 16, 1998, near Las Vegas. Her body was found on June 2 near Buttonwillow, California.
- Lanette Deyon White (25) - Killed on September 25, 1998, in Ontario, California, then dumped near Lodi, California.
- Patricia Anne Tamez (29) - Killed in Hesperia, California. Her body was found on October 23, 1998, in an aqueduct in San Bernardino, California.

== Arrest and trial ==
Ford turned himself in; he walked into the Humboldt County Sheriff Department on November 2, 1998, with his brother and had a woman's severed breast in his pocket. He confessed to having killed four women and is thought to have killed others.

He was found guilty of four counts of first-degree murder on June 27, 2006, and was sentenced to death in August 2006. Currently, he resides on death row at California Men's Colony in California.

== In media ==
Multiple documentaries covered the case.

- In 2013 Investigation Discovery aired a 45-minute long documentary titled Killer Truckers about serial killer truck drivers, including Ford.
- In 2015, TV show Most Evil analyzed the Ford case in season 4. He was ranked 17 out of the 22 levels on the scale.
- In 2019, in a Reelz TV show I Lived With a Killer, Wayne's brother Rodney spoke about their childhood, how he learned about the murders, and how he convinced him to turn himself in.
- In 2021, in an episode of Evil Lives Here Wayne's first wife, Kelly Pletcher spoke about their abusive relationship.
- In 2024, the British TV series Most Evil Killers made an episode about his crimes in the series’ eighth season.

== See also ==
- List of death row inmates in the United States § California
- List of serial killers in the United States
