= Harvey Miguel Robinson =

American serial killer (born 1974)

- Undated mug shot of Robinson
- Born: December 6, 1974 (age 51); Allentown, Pennsylvania, U.S.
- Status: Incarcerated
- Convictions: First degree murder (3 counts); Attempted murder; Burglary
- Penalty: Death

Details
- Victims: 3
- Span of crimes: 1992–1993
- Country: United States
- Location: Pennsylvania
- Weapon: Knife
- Date apprehended: December 6, 1993
- Imprisoned at: SCI Phoenix

Harvey Miguel Robinson (born December 6, 1974) is an American serial killer currently imprisoned on death row in Pennsylvania. He was 17 when he committed his violent spree, killing three and injuring two.

== Early life ==
Robinson was born on December 6, 1974, in Allentown, Pennsylvania. His father was an alcoholic musician from Pottstown, Pennsylvania, who physically and emotionally abused Robinson's mother, who eventually left the family. His father was later incarcerated for beating his 27-year-old mistress, Marlene E. Perez, to death. Perez was so brutally beaten that she was nearly unrecognizable, according to police reports.

Robinson was first arrested at the age of nine. In school, he exhibited traits of severe conduct disorder, including threats and outbursts, which intensified as he aged.

== Crimes ==
Robinson's rape and murder victims were:

- Joan Burghardt, a 29-year-old nurse's aide (August 1992)
- Charlotte Schmoyer, a 15-year-old newspaper carrier for The Morning Call and a student at Dieruff High School in Allentown (June 1993)
- Jessica Jean Fortney, a 47-year-old grandmother (July 1993)

Between the murders of Burghardt and Schmoyer, Robinson was arrested for burglary and served eight months in prison. After the murder of Schmoyer, he was almost apprehended when he was pulled over for a speeding violation. But Robinson received his speeding ticket and left.

== Capture ==
Denise Sam-Cali was one of two of Robinson's victims who survived. The other was a five-year-old girl Robinson stalked for days; Robinson broke into her home, raped and choked her, and left her for dead, but she survived. Sam-Cali managed to break free of Robinson's grip and run outside. Robinson attempted to attack her again but she fled. Police later used Sam-Cali as bait to lure Robinson in order to capture him. When she did, a shootout erupted between Robinson and a police officer. Robinson fled, but sustained wounds. He sought care at a local hospital, where he was arrested.

== Aftermath ==
In November 1994, Robinson was sentenced to death for his crimes. As of April 2006, Robinson's execution had been stayed. He was later resentenced to life imprisonment for the murder of Joan Burghardt because he was 17 when the crime was committed. On December 14, 2012, Robinson agreed to waive his appeal rights in the Schmoyer case in exchange for a life sentence. In December 2013, the Supreme Court of Pennsylvania upheld Robinson's death penalty in the Fortney murder.

In October 2019, a Pennsylvania judge resentenced Robinson to 35 years to life in prison after he successfully appealed his earlier conviction for the murder of Burghardt. The judge urged Robinson to consider donating his brain to science, calling it "the one gift you can give."

In March 2026, Robinson's execution was stayed by Governor Josh Shapiro.

Robinson is incarcerated at SCI Phoenix in Skippack Township, Pennsylvania.

== In the media ==
In 1996, the story of Robinson's crime spree was depicted in the film No One Could Protect Her with Joanna Kerns playing the role of surviving victim Denise Sam-Cali.

In 2015, Robinson's crime spree was covered on the Investigation Discovery series Your Worst Nightmare.

Also in 2015, Robinson's crimes were covered on A&E's Killer Kids and Investigation Discovery's Most Evil and Dead of Night.

== See also ==
- List of serial killers in the United States
- List of death row inmates in the United States § Pennsylvania
