= Paul Devoe =

American convicted spree killer (born 1963)

- Born: Paul Gilbert Devoe III; August 31, 1963 (age 63); Long Island, New York, U.S.
- Status: Incarcerated on death row
- Motive: Rage
- Conviction: Capital murder
- Penalty: Death (October 8, 2009)

Details
- Victims: 6
- Date: August 24–25, 2007
- Locations: Texas, Pennsylvania
- Weapon: .380 Jennings semi-automatic pistol
- Imprisoned at: Allan B. Polunsky Unit

Paul Gilbert Devoe III (born August 31, 1963) is an American convicted spree killer and mass murderer responsible for six murders committed in Texas and Pennsylvania. Devoe reportedly committed the murders over a two-day period in August 2007 due to his then girlfriend putting up a restraining order on him. Devoe first killed 41-year-old Michael Allred at a local bar in Marble Falls, Texas, before he went to his ex-girlfriend Paula Griffith's house in Jonestown, Texas, where he shot and killed Griffith and her teenage daughter Haylie Faulkner, as well as Griffith's boyfriend Jay Feltner and Faulkner's friend Danielle Hensley. Devoe fled to Pennsylvania, where he murdered 81-year-old Betty Jane Dehart. Devoe was eventually arrested in New York and sent back to Texas, where he was convicted of capital murder and sentenced to death on October 8, 2009. Devoe is currently on death row at the Allan B. Polunsky Unit, awaiting his execution.

== Personal life ==
Paul Gilbert Devoe III was born in the state of New York on August 31, 1963. Devoe's parents divorced when he was two; he never knew his birth father, and his mother remarried. Devoe, who grew up on Long Island, dropped out of school at the ninth grade, and during his early adolescent years, Devoe began to consume alcohol frequently, and he was said to have exhibited violent outbursts around this age. Devoe also had a history of abusing his girlfriends.

When Devoe was in his 20s, he fired a shotgun at group of teenagers in midst of a drinking session and even looped a telephone cord around his mother's neck. This led to his mother applying for a protective order against him. Between 1980 and 2002, Devoe had several run-ins with the law in New York and was frequently in and out of prison, including five convictions for driving under influence, as well as criminal trespassing, aggravated harassment and petit larceny.

During this 22-year period, Devoe had four children from multiple relationships, all of which ended as a result of Devoe severely abusing the women while he was drunk. In 2005, Devoe relocated to Texas and settled in Hill County, but he continued to abuse alcohol and abuse the women he was dating and cohabiting with.

== Spree murder ==
From August 24 to August 25, 2007, Paul Devoe committed a total of six murders in Texas and Pennsylvania over a two-day period.

Prior to the killings, Devoe had broken up with his then girlfriend, Glenda Purcell, who applied for a restraining order against him after Devoe had violently assaulted her, leaving her with a broken nose, severe back injury and a black eye. After the break-up, Devoe was allowed to stay with a female acquaintance on the condition that he would help her do some construction work. However, Devoe was found to have a gun in his possession, which the acquaintance had prohibited, and it prompted her to kick Devoe out of her house. Out of rage over this, compounded by the fact that Purcell brought up a protection order against him, Devoe left the house after stealing a blue pickup truck from the property.

Michael Allred

On the evening of August 24, 2007, hours after leaving his friend's house, Devoe went to a local bar in Marble Falls, Texas, where Purcell was a regular patron. Devoe confronted Purcell at gunpoint and tried to fire at her, but the gun jammed. Purcell fled into another room to seek help from the bar's 41-year-old bartender Michael Allred (July 26, 1966 – August 24, 2007). Although Allred tried to calm Devoe down and asked him to hand over the gun, he was shot on the chest by Devoe and died on the spot.

Paula Griffith, Jay Feltner, Haylie Faulkner, and Danielle Hensley

On the same day he murdered Allred, Devoe drove to Jonestown, Texas, where one of his ex-girlfriends, 46-year-old Paula Griffith (January 8, 1961 – August 24, 2007), resided with her daughter and boyfriend. Devoe arrived at Griffith's house, where Griffith was present along with her 15-year-old daughter Haylie Faulkner (May 25, 1992 – August 24, 2007), her 48-year-old boyfriend Jay Feltner (October 7, 1958 – August 24, 2007), and Faulkner's 17-year-old friend Danielle Hensley (January 30, 1990 – August 24, 2007), who was staying over with the trio for an upcoming amusement park trip. Devoe shot and killed all the four occupants in the house.

The bodies of the four victims were later discovered by Hensley's stepfather and mother, who were both worried about Hensley's safety after she did not call back home to say good night as she normally did. Their anxiety was heightened due to them seeing the news of Allred's murder, and it prompted them to head to Griffith's house, where the couple found the bodies of Hensley and the other three victims, as well as the pickup truck previously driven by Devoe. According to an autopsy report, Griffith died from a gunshot wound to the back of her head, while Faulkner died from a gunshot wound to her right temple. Feltner sustained a lethal gunshot wound inflicted close range to his left temple; the bullet also penetrated Feltner's right arm. Hensley was shot four times, including three times in the head.

Betty Jane Dehart

After the Jonestown murders, Devoe stole Griffith's station wagon and drove to New York to evade capture. On the way back to his hometown, the vehicle began to stall and was not functioning well. Devoe, who had reached Greencastle, Pennsylvania on August 25, 2007, decided to stop and find another car. Devoe stopped outside the home of 81-year-old Betty Jane Dehart (May 26, 1926 – August 25, 2007), intending to rob her of her Hyundai Elantra. He shot and killed Dehart and drove off in Dehart's car.

== Arrest and charges ==
After murdering Dehart, Paul Devoe fled to New York and returned to his hometown in Long Island. Meanwhile, the police conducted a manhunt for Devoe, and on August 27, 2007, two days after the murder of Dehart, Devoe was arrested by officers affiliated with the New York/New Jersey Regional Fugitive Task Force. Devoe reportedly threatened to turn a gun on himself before he was persuaded to surrender.

In September 2007, it was decided that Devoe would be first sent back to Texas and stand trial for the murders he committed there before Pennsylvania could prosecute him.

On November 20, 2007, Devoe was formally indicted by a Travis County grand jury for the capital murders of both Danielle Hensley and Haylie Faulkner. Under Texas state law, an offence of capital murder carries the death penalty or life imprisonment without the possibility of parole. On December 19, 2007, Assistant District Attorney Gary Cobb announced that he would seek the death penalty for Devoe.

Before Devoe could be brought to trial for the murders, two psychiatrists had submitted reports that Devoe was mentally unfit. In December 2008, Devoe was formally found mentally incompetent to stand trial, and a court order was issued for him to be detained at a maximum-security psychiatric hospital for treatment until he was fit to be tried. Chuck Ardo, the press secretary of Pennsylvania Governor Ed Rendell, announced that the Commonwealth of Pennsylvania still intended to have Devoe tried in Pennsylvania for the murder of Betty Dehart upon the conclusion of trial proceedings against Devoe in Texas.

In April 2009, Devoe was found to be mentally competent to stand trial for the murders. District Judge Brenda Kennedy issued the ruling after she received psychiatric reports in February of that same year, in which the medical staff from North Texas State Hospital certified Devoe to be mentally fit to plead. On August 26, 2009, Devoe officially pleaded not guilty to the capital murder charges against him.

== Capital murder trial in Texas ==
On September 28, 2009, Paul Devoe stood trial at the Blackwell-Thurman Criminal Justice Center for two counts of capital murder pertaining to the deaths of Haylie Faulkner and Danielle Hensley. On October 2, 2009, Devoe was found guilty of both counts.

During the sentencing trial, the prosecution sought the death penalty for Devoe, stating that Devoe had "a lifetime of hurting people, threatening them," and his violent nature could pose a huge risk to the safety of other prisoners and correction officers. Devoe's defence counsel argued against the death penalty, submitting that their client did not have a history of disciplinary problems during his imprisonment, and that the prosecution failed to prove that Devoe would commit further acts of violence in prison.

On October 8, 2009, Devoe was sentenced to death for both murder counts upon the jury's unanimous recommendation for capital punishment. During the hearing, the bereaved families of the two girls were allowed to make victim impact statements, and Haylie Faulkner's grandfather personally addressed Devoe, saying that justice would be served with his execution and he shall "burn in hell," while Danielle Hensley's mother stated that Devoe deserved to be haunted by her daughter for having killed her. He was formally transferred to death row at the Allan B. Polunsky Unit on October 16, 2009.

In May 2010, it was confirmed that Devoe would not be extradited back to Pennsylvania to stand trial for the murder of Betty Dehart. Franklin County District Attorney Matt Fogal agreed to not seek the extradition of Devoe for trial on charges of killing Dehart, after Dehart's family stated they received closure with Devoe's death sentence in Texas and decided to leave his fate to the Texas state authorities. Devoe similarly did not stand trial for the killings of Michael Allred, Jay Feltner and Paula Griffith, although the prosecution still reserve the right to prosecute him in further trials for these cases.

== Death row ==
Given his presumed victim count, Paul Devoe was classified as one of the most prolific killers in Travis County, Texas.

After his sentencing in 2009, Devoe was incarcerated at the Allan B. Polunsky Unit, the state's designated facility for male death row inmates. As of August 2023, Devoe was listed as one of 184 inmates held on death row in Texas.

=== Appeals ===
On December 14, 2011, Paul Devoe's direct appeal was denied by the Texas Court of Criminal Appeals.

On January 14, 2014, the Texas Court of Criminal Appeals turned down Devoe's appeal against his death sentence.

On January 13, 2016, the Texas Court of Criminal Appeals dismissed Devoe's appeal against his death sentence.

On January 9, 2018, the 5th U.S. Circuit Court of Appeals rejected Devoe's appeal.

On May 14, 2018, Devoe's final appeal was denied by the U.S. Supreme Court.

=== Motion for execution date ===
In January 2026, Texas Attorney General Ken Paxton's office formally filed a motion seeking an execution date for Devoe.

=== In popular media ===
In 2015, the Paul Devoe spree murders were re-enacted by American crime documentary series Most Evil. In the episode featuring Devoe's case, Devoe was portrayed by American actor Will Cooper.

== See also ==
- Capital punishment in Texas
- List of death row inmates in the United States § Texas
- List of rampage killers in the United States
