= Wixom Assembly Plant shooting =

1996 mass shooting in Wixom, Michigan

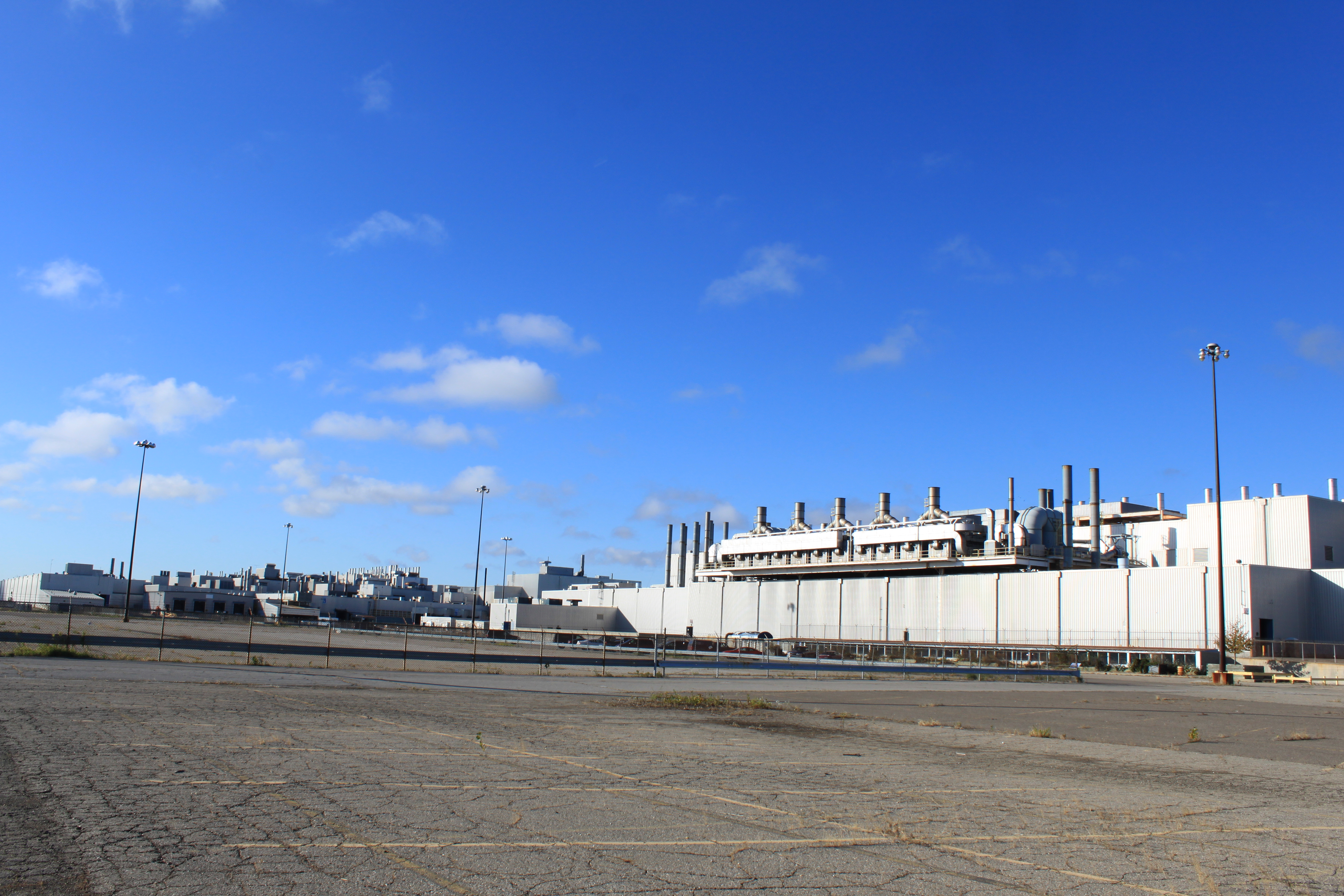
- Wixom Assembly Plant in October 2010
- Location: Wixom, Michigan, United States
- Date: November 14, 1996; 11:20 a.m. – 4:25 p.m. (UTC–5)
- Target: Wixom Assembly Plant
- Attack type: Mass shooting
- Weapon: AK-47 style rifle
- Deaths: 1
- Injuries: 3
- Perpetrator: Gerald M. Atkins
- Verdict: Guilty on all counts

On November 14, 1996, U.S. Army veteran Gerald M. Atkins opened fire inside the Wixom Assembly Plant, a Ford Motor Company manufacturing facility in Wixom, Michigan, after being denied entry to propose to a woman with whom he was infatuated.

One person was killed by Atkins, while three others were injured, including two responding police officers. Atkins was charged with first-degree murder and 25 counts of felonies. He was sentenced to life in prison without the possibility of parole after a jury rejected his insanity defense of erotomania in April 1998.

== Background ==
Atkins was born on November 3, 1967, in Farmington Hills, Michigan. He was arrested in Farmington Hills in 1986 for shooting at cars and buildings. In 1996, he was a U.S. Army veteran living alone and working at a glass factory in Oakland County, Michigan, and he was also an active member of the Michigan National Guard. By the time of the shooting, Atkins was under disciplinary action due to attendance problems and for having a fight with another guardsman. A short time before the attack, Atkins met Debra Myers at a bar near her job at Wixom Assembly Plant. According to Myers, who testified during Atkins's trial in 1998, she did not share the feelings that he allegedly felt for her and rejected his advances several times, ultimately calling him "a pest" upon his insistence. Atkins was nonetheless undeterred and believed that third parties were disrupting a potential relationship between them.

== Shooting ==
On the morning of November 14, 1996, Atkins went to the Wixom Assembly Plant to propose marriage to Myers. Security guards at the entrance, however, denied him entry and turned him away. Atkins returned in military fatigues and armed with an AK-47 rifle, storming the plant at around 11:20 a.m. (EST). He fired more than 300 rounds of live ammo, killing 57-year-old plant manager Darrel Izzard. A technician was hurt by flying glass and two responding police officers who confronted Atkins outside the plant were wounded by gunfire. Atkins shot at police (more than 100 law enforcement personnel responded to the scene), and continued shooting at passing cars on the nearby Interstate 96.

Police arrested Atkins five hours later, while he was hiding in the drain tunnels under the Wixom plant, at around 4:15 pm. He was taken to the Oakland County Jail, where he remained awaiting charges.

== Aftermath ==
Police initially reported that Myers was Atkins's estranged girlfriend and confirmed that Izzard had not been an intended target. A truck driver who was pushed aside by Atkins as he forced his way into the plant testified that he kept saying "it's payback time." Another witness described him as "Rambo coming around the corner." A long-time friend described Atkins as having a "big heart", but admitted that he was also "intense", saying that something "must have made him snap."

On November 16, 1996, the District Attorney Office charged Atkins with one count of first-degree murder and 25 other felonies. Police offered further details on the day of the arraignment, indicating that Atkins had premeditated and planned the shooting. The murder victim, Darrell Izzard, was the second manager in command of the plant and a native of Brighton, Michigan. A Ford spokesman said that Izzard, who was married and had three adult children, had worked there for 18 years. Plant worker Jim Maher testified that they heard gunshots, and that Izzard went to investigate when he encountered Atkins. Maher said that Izzard pleaded for his life before being shot and killed by Atkins.

== Trial and incarceration ==
In April 1998, Atkins was tried on 26 counts, including the murder of Izzard. He pleaded not guilty by reason of insanity, alleging that he would "not let anybody infringe on [Myers] rights." He also said that Myers was afraid of Ford personnel, political action committees (PAC), and President Clinton, whom Atkins accused of controlling PACs.

Atkins's defense attorney, J. Herbert Larson, called forensic psychologist J. Reid Meloy as a defense witness. Meloy, an associate professor at the University of California, San Diego, was an expert in issues related to stalking, harassment, and erotomania. He had testified for the prosecution in the federal trial of the Oklahoma City bombing against Timothy McVeigh and Terry Nichols and in stalking cases like John Hinckley Jr., who shot President Reagan to "impress" actress Jodie Foster, and for the prosecution of Robert Dewey Hoskins, a mentally ill man with violent tendencies who stalked pop singer Madonna in the 1990s.

Meloy agreed to travel from California and became a defense witness for Atkins, testifying in court in Pontiac, Michigan. He compared Atkins's obsession with that of Hinckley's with Foster and said that Atkins believed that Ford Motor Company was "somehow preventing him from proposing to Myers", despite they both barely knew each other and that Myers had rejected his advances. Atkins's defense attorneys did not contest his responsibility, but contended that he was legally insane at the time of the shooting due to erotomania.

On April 21, 1998, the jury rejected Atkins's insanity plea and found him guilty on all counts. He was subsequently sentenced to life in prison without the possibility of parole. Atkins appealed the verdict and asked for the suppression of incriminatory evidence taken during the initial interrogations. He claimed that his right to counsel was violated, but the Michigan Court of Appeals rejected his appeal and upheld the life sentence in October 2000.

Atkins is incarcerated at the Kinross Correctional Facility in Kincheloe, Michigan.

== In popular culture ==
Atkins was taken as an example of delusional erotomania by one of his defense witnesses (Meloy), who wrote about his case in a 1999 publication about stalking and in his 2000 book Clinical Assessment of Dangerousness, where Meloy explains Atkins's actions and their relation with triangulation in cases of erotomania.

The case is also featured in the Investigation Discovery show Most Evil, where forensic psychiatrist Michael H. Stone put Atkins at level 16 of his 22-level scale of evil.
