= Fetal abduction =

Forced cesarean on kidnapped pregnant woman

Fetal abduction refers to the rare crime of child abduction by kidnapping of an at term pregnant woman and extraction of her fetus through a cesarean section. Dr. Michael H. Stone and Dr. Gary Brucato have alternatively referred to this crime as "fetus-snatching" or "fetus abduction." Homicide expert Vernon J. Geberth has used the term "fetal kidnapping." In the small number of reported cases, a few pregnant victims and about half of their fetuses survived the assault and non-medically performed cesarean.

Fetal abduction does not refer to medically induced labor or obstetrical extraction. The definition of the subject does not include compulsory cesarean sections for medical reasons nor child removal from parents for court-approved child protection. However, the "Children of the Disappeared" (desaparecidos) in the Argentine Dirty War are an example of criminal fetal abduction in state institutions as detailed by testimonies on cesarean delivery on desaparecidas and child adoption in a military hospital. Historical cases of cesarean extraction for fetal murder (not for child adoption) fall outside the subject definition.

Fetal abductions typically start with the lie that the perpetrator is pregnant and often coincide with a fear of losing a romantic partner. Then the perpetrator murders a pregnant woman to claim the fetus as her own (as a stillborn baby or, if the fetus survives, as a newborn child).

== Abductor profile ==
Fetal abduction is mostly perpetrated by women, usually after organized planning. The abductor may befriend the pregnant victim. In some cases, the abductor impersonates a pregnant woman, and later a puerperal mother, using weight gain or a prosthesis to fake a pregnancy, and cutting of the reproductive organs to replicate injuries gained during birth. Some abductors take the neonate to a hospital. The National Center for Missing and Exploited Children’s spokesperson, Cathy Nahirny, stated in 2007, “Many times the abductor fakes a pregnancy and when it is time to deliver the baby, must abduct someone else's child”. Criminal motives include delusions of fulfilling a partner relationship, child-bearing and childbirth.

== Statistics ==
The National Center for Missing and Exploited Children recorded 18 cases of fetal abductions in the United States between 1983 and 2015, which represented 6% of the 302 recorded cases of infant abduction.

== List of reported cases and attempts ==
This list distinguishes actual abductions from attempted abductions. An attempt can involve severe harm inflicted on both the mother and fetus, but it does not result in the mother's murder or the extraction of the fetus.

=== Fetal abduction cases ===
==== 1987 ====
- In Albuquerque, New Mexico, 23-year-old Cindy Ray was eight months pregnant when she was kidnapped at Kirtland Air Force Base outside a prenatal clinic. Darci Pierce was nineteen years old when she strangled the pregnant woman to death. She used her car keys to open Ray's womb. The unharmed fetus, Amelia Monik, survived. Pierce was found to be mentally ill, but guilty of first degree murder, first degree kidnapping, and child abuse. She was sentenced to life in prison plus 19.5 years, to run concurrently. Pierce became eligible for parole in 2017, but her parole requests have all been denied.

==== 1995 ====
- In Addison, Illinois, 28-year-old Debra Evans was murdered in her apartment. Jacqueline Annette Williams (28), her boyfriend Fedell Caffey (22), and her cousin Laverne Ward (24) went into Evans' home and shot her in the head. Ward was the ex-boyfriend of Evans. She had three children and was pregnant with a fourth. The murderers then proceeded to cut through her womb with scissors and remove the fetus. During the break-in, Evans' 10-year-old daughter Samantha was stabbed in her sleep while her other two children, 7-year-old Joshua and 2-year-old Jordan, were kidnapped along with the fetus. Joshua was found dead in an alleyway the next day. The three murderers were caught with the surviving boy and the fetus, later named Elijah. Williams, Caffey, and Ward were all convicted of three counts of first degree murder. Williams and Caffey were sentenced to death, while Ward was sentenced to life in prison without parole after jurors voted against a death sentence in his case. Williams and Caffey had their sentences commuted to life without parole after Governor George Ryan commuted the death sentences of everyone on death row in Illinois in 2003.

==== 1996 ====
- In Tuscaloosa, Alabama, seventeen-year-old Carethia Curry was murdered by her friend, 29-year-old Felicia Scott. Curry was abducted by Scott on a night out; she was found three months later, stuffed in a garbage can at the bottom of a fifty-foot ravine with several gunshot wounds to the head, her torso sliced open. The baby girl whom Curry was carrying survived. Scott was found guilty of capital murder and sentenced to life in prison without parole after jurors unanimously voted against a death sentence. Scott's boyfriend, Frederick Polion, was acquitted of capital murder, but convicted of first degree kidnapping and sentenced to 20 years in prison. Scott's sister, Angela Burton, was convicted of hindering prosecution in the first degree for trying to cover up the murder and was sentenced to 17 years in prison.

==== 1998 ====
- In Fresno, California, Margarita Flores was eight months pregnant when she received a phone call from Josephina Saldana, who offered her gifts of baby furniture and a free one-year supply of diapers. Flores went to a warehouse to collect them and was murdered. Saldana was caught at a hospital the day afterwards carrying a dead fetus that she claimed to have just given birth to. Saldana hanged herself in prison in 2001, three days after her conviction for kidnapping and murdering Flores and her unborn child, and three weeks before her sentencing to life imprisonment.

==== 2000 ====
- In Ravenna, Ohio, Theresa Andrews was twenty-three years old and pregnant when she ran into Michelle Bica. Bica was thirty-nine-years-old and was pretending to be pregnant at the time, and the two exchanged addresses. Bica started stalking Andrews. On September 27, 2000, Bica invited Andrews to her home, then killed her, extracted the fetus she was carrying, and buried the woman in her garage. The baby survived, and Bica claimed he was her son. Bica shot herself while being investigated by the FBI.

==== 2003 ====
- In Okemah, Oklahoma, Carolyn Simpson was twenty-one years old and six months pregnant when she was shot and killed. She worked at a casino, where her murderer, Effie Goodson, age thirty-seven, was a regular customer. Goodson offered to give Simpson a ride home, and Simpson was later found in a ditch two miles away from her abductor. The baby, removed from the mother's womb three months premature, did not survive. When Goodson brought the fetus to the hospital, the child was pronounced dead, and it was discovered that she was not the mother. She was initially found incompetent to stand trial. Three years later, Goodson agreed to drop her insanity plea, pleaded guilty, and was sentenced to life in prison without parole, in exchange for prosecutors not seeking a death sentence.

==== 2004 ====
- In Girardot (Cundinamarca), Colombia in April, a case was reported in which both the mother and child survived. Aseneth Piedrahita extracted the baby boy of Sol Angela Cartagena Bernal, 8 months pregnant. Reportedly, the perpetrator had some degree of medical knowledge. Piedrahita had offered Cartagena food and baby clothes before drugging her with a sleeping pill mixed into her coffee.
- In Skidmore, Missouri, Bobbie Jo Stinnett died of strangulation at the age of twenty-three at the hands of thirty-seven-year-old Lisa M. Montgomery. The two had been in contact previously; they were both Rat Terrier breeders in a dog show circuit. Montgomery had e-mailed the victim, telling her that she wished to purchase one of her dogs. Montgomery faked a pregnancy, and on December 16, she drove from her Kansas home to Skidmore, Missouri. After strangling Stinnett to death, Montgomery cut open her abdomen and took her one-month-premature daughter. An hour later, the victim's mother found her body, and less than twenty-four hours later Victoria Jo Stinnett, the victim's stolen fetus, was found healthy in Melvern, Kansas. Since the baby was taken over state lines, the crime became a federal case and Lisa Montgomery was tried under the Federal Kidnapping Act. A jury subsequently found Montgomery guilty and sentenced her to death. Montgomery, 52, was executed by lethal injection on January 13, 2021, at the United States Penitentiary in Terre Haute, Indiana.

==== 2006 ====
- In East St. Louis, Illinois on September 15, 2006, the 23-year-old Jimella Tunstall, seven months pregnant, was murdered by her childhood friend, 24-year-old Tiffany Hall. She was beaten unconscious with a table leg and had her unborn baby cut from her abdomen with a pair of scissors. Neither survived the attack. Tunstall's body was left in a vacant lot. Hall also drowned Tunstall's three children, ages one, two, and seven, and left their bodies in the washer and dryer machines in the family's apartment. To avoid a possible death sentence, Hall pleaded guilty and was sentenced to life in prison without parole in June 2008.

==== 2008 ====
- In Kennewick, Washington, Araceli Camacho Gomez, age twenty-seven, was stabbed to death by twenty-three-year-old Phiengchai Sisouvanh Synhavong. Gomez's hands and feet were bound with yarn throughout the attack, and her fetus was cut from her womb with a box cutter. The child survived the attack. Synhavong called the police for help and attempted to pass the fetus off as her own. It quickly became apparent to authorities that she was lying and guilty of the crime. Synhavong was found guilty of aggravated first degree murder and sentenced to life in prison without parole. The prosecutor declined to seek a death sentence due to her lack of a criminal history and the wishes of the victim's family.
- In Wilkinsburg, Pennsylvania, pregnant eighteen-year-old Kia Johnson was murdered during a fetal abduction by 38-year-old Andrea Curry-Demus, who had previously spent eight years in prison for stabbing another expectant mother to obtain her unborn baby. Curry-Demus had also seized a child from a hospital. Johnson's body was later found in Curry-Demus' apartment. The baby survived.

==== 2009 ====
- In Worcester, Massachusetts, Julie A. Corey, 35, murdered Darlene Haynes, 23, and extracted her fetus. The baby, Sheila Marie survived. Corey was convicted of first degree murder and sentenced to life in prison without parole in February 2014.
- In Portland, Oregon, Korena Elaine Roberts, 29, murdered pregnant Heather Megan Snively, 21, before cutting the fetus out of Snively's uterus. Roberts had been faking a pregnancy to her boyfriend and family, claiming she was expecting twins. She posted advertisements for baby items on Craigslist, and after multiple attempts to meet with other pregnant women fell through, she was able to lure Snively to her Beaverton-area home where she lived with her boyfriend and her two children on June 5, 2009. She then murdered Snively in the bathroom and cut the fetus, a baby boy, out of Snively's uterus. After covering Snively's body in carpet and hiding it in a crawlspace beneath the house, Roberts called her boyfriend, Yan Shubin, claiming she needed help delivering her baby. He came home to find Roberts in the bathtub with the water running, crying uncontrollably and holding the baby boy, who was not breathing. Paramedics took Roberts and the baby to the hospital, where doctors determined that Roberts had not given birth. Hospital staff called police, who arrested Roberts and located Snively's body in Roberts' home that night. The baby boy could not be revived and was pronounced dead at the hospital. An autopsy showed that Snively suffered between 15 and 30 blows, mostly to the back of her head, as well as multiple cuts to her right breast and abdomen, and bite marks on her right arm. The medical examiner was able to determine that while the head injuries likely knocked Snively unconscious, it was the abdominal incisions and blood loss that killed her. To avoid a possible death sentence, Roberts pleaded guilty to aggravated murder and was sentenced to life in prison without parole.

==== 2011 ====
- In Bowling Green, Kentucky, 33-year-old Kathy Michelle Coy lured 21-year-old Jamie Stice to a dirt road, shot her with a stun gun before slashing her throat, wrists and abdomen, leaving Stice to bleed to death while Coy cut out her baby boy, Isiah Reynolds. Coy initially claimed she had given birth to the baby five weeks premature, but doctors determined that the baby wasn't hers. Police found that Coy was friends on Facebook with Stice and another pregnant woman. The other woman was unharmed, but police grew suspicious when they couldn't find Stice. After intense questioning, Coy led police to Stice's body. Coy was charged with murder and kidnapping of a minor, pleading guilty but mentally ill to avoid the death penalty. In March 2012, she was sentenced to life in prison without parole.
- In Milwaukee, Wisconsin, 33-year-old Annette Morales-Rodriguez kidnapped 23-year-old Martiza Ramirez-Cruz, beat her to death and cut her fetus out of the womb. Ramirez-Cruz was 40 weeks pregnant and the fetus was just days away from being due. According to a criminal complaint, Morales-Rodriguez called police hours later to report that she'd just given birth in her shower and the baby wasn't breathing. The fetus was pronounced dead, and an autopsy determined the baby did not belong to Morales-Rodriguez. She was convicted of first degree murder and sentenced to mandatory life imprisonment on September 19, 2012.
- In Oakdale, Louisiana, 32-year-old Pamela Causey-Fregia killed pregnant 22-year-old Victoria Marie Perez with blunt force trauma. Causey tried to convince her husband, who was leaving her, that she was pregnant, despite her family believing she had a hysterectomy. She burned Perez's body, and buried the remains on her property. Causey's young children witnessed the murder and alerted police in 2015. In March 2018 Causey-Fregia pled guilty to murder and was sentenced to life imprisonment.

==== 2013 ====
- In Mogale City, South Africa in January 2013, Loretta Cooke extracted the fetus of Valencia Behrens. The mother was found dead, while the fetus survived.
- In Johannesburg, South Africa on July 31, 2013, Zandile Makulana extracted Pretty Tsanga's fetus. Neither the mother nor her baby survived.

==== 2015 ====
- In Longmont, Colorado, 34-year-old Dynel Lane posted a Craigslist ad advertising free maternity clothes. When the seven months pregnant 26-year-old Michelle Wilkins responded to the ad, Lane broke a lava lamp over her head and stabbed her in the neck with glass from the broken lamp, before removing the fetus from her body. According to police reports, Lane's husband got home and she claimed to have had a miscarriage. Her husband found the baby in the bathtub, rolled her over and saw her gasping for air; he then took both Lane and the baby to the hospital, but the baby was either already dead or died within minutes. Wilkins survived the attack and while in Lane's basement she was able to lock the door, call 911, and get medical assistance. On April 29, 2016, Lane was sentenced to 100 years imprisonment. According to Colorado law, no homicide charge was brought as the mother survived and the neonate was found to have been not viable. Wilkins named the child, a girl, Aurora and was reunited with her in the hospital, though the reunification took place after Aurora had been pronounced dead. Wilkins was interviewed about the attack on the September 14, 2015 episode of Dr. Phil.
- In the Bronx, New York City, Angelikque Sutton, 22, who was almost nine months pregnant, was killed by Ashleigh Wade, 22. Sutton was stabbed to death in her Wakefield apartment after having her throat cut. Wade, who was a childhood friend of Sutton, then used paring scissors to cut out the baby girl, Jenasis Sutton, who survived, and passed her off as her own daughter. Wade was charged with second degree murder and manslaughter. On November 16, 2017, she was sentenced to 40 years to life in prison after being convicted of second degree murder and second degree kidnapping.

==== 2017 ====
- In Fargo, North Dakota, William Hoehn (32 years old) and Brooke Crews (38) were charged on August 28, 2017, with conspiring to kidnap and murder pregnant Savanna Greywind (22) and to kidnap her baby. Greywind's body was found in the river 8 days after she disappeared on August 19. The newborn, named Haisley Jo, survived. Crews pleaded guilty and said Greywind was still alive when she performed the cesarean on her. Hoehn was acquitted of conspiracy to commit murder, but convicted of conspiracy to commit kidnapping and giving false information to law enforcement. The maximum sentence for these charges was 21 years in prison, but Hoehn was sentenced to life in prison with the possibility of parole after 30 years after the judge deemed him a dangerous special offender as a result of his prior convictions. In 2019, Hoehn's dangerous special offender status was overturned by the North Dakota Supreme Court and he was resentenced to 20 years in prison.

==== 2019 ====
- A nine-month pregnant 19-year-old woman, Marlen Ochoa-Lopez (alternately referred to by her maiden name Ochoa-Uriostegui in some reporting), was lured to a house in the Scottsdale neighborhood of Chicago with the promise of free baby clothes on April 23, and then strangled. Police believe that "the baby was forcibly removed following that murder" and a 46-year-old woman living at the residence subsequently called emergency services and stated that she had just given birth to the infant. The baby boy was stated to be in critical condition then. The deceased mother's body was found on the property on May 15. The boy, named Yovanny Jadiel Lopez, died several weeks later from brain damage. 46-year-old Clarisa Figueroa and her daughter, 29-year-old Desiree Figueroa, were charged with first degree murder among other counts. Clarisa's husband Piotr Bobak was charged with associated crimes. In 2023, he was sentenced to four years in prison for obstruction of justice. On April 16, 2024, Clarisa Figueroa was sentenced to 50 years in prison without parole after pleading guilty. On May 29 of the same year, Desiree Figueroa was sentenced to 30 years in prison without parole after also pleading guilty.

==== 2020 ====
- On August 28, 24-year-old Flávia Godinho Mafra was eight months and two weeks pregnant, she was lured to a fake baby shower in São João Batista, Santa Catarina, Brazil. She was later found dead due to cuts from her abdomen due to her baby being removed, and from being struck with a brick. A 26-year-old suspect was arrested in connection with the murder. The woman told police that she had suffered a 3-month miscarriage in January but continued lying to everyone about still being pregnant. The baby survived the incident.
- 21-year-old Reagan Simmons-Hancock, who was eight months pregnant, was killed on October 9 in New Boston, Texas. Her baby was cut from her body by 27-year-old Taylor Rene Parker. The baby girl, Braxlynn Sage Simmons, did not survive. Parker, who claimed to only know Hancock by her first name, had been the photographer at Hancock's wedding the year before and had spent time with Hancock the week of the murder going out for a "girl’s day" and visited Hancock and her husband's home the night before telling them she was to be induced the following day, which was the day the murders occurred. Parker was later arrested in Oklahoma in connection with the case. She was convicted of Hancock's murder in October 2022. She was sentenced to death by lethal injection in November 2022.

==== 2022 ====
- 33-year-old Ashley Bush, who was 31 weeks pregnant, was killed between October 31 and November 2 in Jane, Missouri. She had been kidnapped by Amber Waterman, 42, after Amber contacted Bush online under a fake name and offered her baby clothes. Waterman picked Bush up in Siloam Springs, Arkansas and brought her to their home, where Bush was shot and had her unborn baby, Valkyrie Grace Willis, cut out of her abdomen by Waterman. The baby did not survive. Bush's body was dumped near Pineville. First responders reported to a call for a baby who was not breathing and Amber Waterman told them she gave birth in a truck on the way to the hospital. Waterman and her husband Jamie were arrested on November 3 and in July 2023, Amber Waterman was charged with kidnapping and murder while Jamie Waterman was charged with being an accessory after the fact to kidnapping resulting in death. In July 2024, Amber Waterman was sentenced to life in prison plus 30 years after pleading guilty. Jamie Waterman also pleaded guilty and faces up to 15 years in prison.

==== 2025 ====
- 22-year-old Rebecca Park, who was approximately 38 weeks pregnant, was allegedly killed on November 3rd in Michigan. Details yet to be determined in court. The baby did not survive. Rebecca Park's body was found on November 25th in Manistee National Forest.

=== Fetal abduction attempts ===
==== 2005 ====
- In Pennsylvania on October 12, 2005, Peggy Jo Conner (38) of Manor Township attacked neighbour Valerie Lyn Oskin (31) with a baseball bat and drove her to a secluded spot afterwards, where Conner, according to court documents, began to cut the abdomen of Oskin with a razor knife in an attempt to remove the 8-½-month-old fetus. Shortly after Conner began working upon Oskin, she was discovered by a young passerby boy, who alerted others and whose dad called the police, rescuing both Oskin and the baby – Both mother and child survived the attacked and the baby was delivered via an emergency Caesarean section, to be put up for adoption later on (which was already intended prior by the mother).The police report stated another eyewitness described finding Oskin being cut and that she "saw a naked woman lying on the ground that was beat so bad that she was unable to recognize her."
  Prior to pleading guilty in 2007, Conner asked permission to marry her former partner Thomas Wilks Jr. in a jailhouse ceremony (possibly without knowledge of Wilks), which the warden refused. Another petition Conner then filed and asked subsequently the County Judge of the same, at which the court also rejected her petition based upon the prosecution's strong opposition, as Conner's partner Wilks could be called as a witness at her own trial, allowing him to refuse giving a testimony (a married person may refrain from testifying against a spouse).
  On May 22th 2007, Conner was sentenced to 22–50 years in prison, after pleading guilty earlier in February of the same year to attempted criminal homicide, kidnapping and aggravated assault on an unborn child.
  In 2012 Armstrong County Judge Kenneth G. Valasek reduced Conner's sentence to nearly half and only 12½–31 years in prison, because the judge said the defendant’s original guilty plea was flawed, as Conner during a appeal hearing in 2011 said, she was allegedly too confused at the time to realize the mistake of pleading guilty of attempted murder with the element of “serious bodily injury” – Among other things, Conner argued that she was on medication that had fogged her judgment when she entered the plea, and that her attorney at the time failed to explore the possibility of an insanity defense, or warn her of the lengthy term mandated by her plea. Consequently, Conner was eligible for parole after serving the minimum sentence around 2017.

==== 2009 ====
- In Washington, D.C., in December 2009, Teka Adams, 29 years old, homeless and nine months pregnant, was abducted by acquaintance Veronica Deramous, aged 40. Deramous enlisted the help of her seventeen-year-old son to tie up Adams and hold her captive for four days. During those four days, Deramous unsuccessfully attempted to extract the fetus. Adams was able to escape, barely clinging to life and severely injured. A neighbor called 911, and both Adams and her fetus survived. The cesarean was completed at a hospital and the baby was named Miracle. In November 2010, Veronica Deramous was sentenced to 25 years imprisonment on a plea bargain for first-degree assault.

== See also ==
- À l'intérieur (Inside), a 2007 French horror film about a pregnant woman who is attacked by a sadistic woman who wants her unborn child.
- Slasher, a 2016 anthology horror television series, is based upon the murder of a husband and wife, whose baby was removed via live caesarean section, before being abducted by the killer.
