= Jack Owen Spillman =

American serial killer

Jack Owen Spillman III
- Spillman's WADOC Inmate Photo
- Born: Roy Wilson; August 30, 1969 (age 57); Spokane, Washington, U.S.
- Other name: The Werewolf Butcher
- Status: Incarcerated
- Conviction: Aggravated first degree murder (3 counts)
- Penalty: Life imprisonment without parole

Details
- Victims: 3
- Span of crimes: 1994–1995
- Country: United States
- State: Washington
- Date apprehended: April 19, 1995
- Imprisoned at: Washington State Penitentiary

Jack Owen Spillman III (born August 30, 1969) is an American rapist and serial killer from Spokane, Washington. He is known as the Werewolf Butcher.

== Crimes ==
Spillman was convicted of the April 1995 rape and murders of Rita Huffman, 48, and her daughter Mandy, 15, and the 1994 murder of Penny Davis, 9. The two had been bludgeoned, stabbed, and their bodies mutilated. Spillman had forced a baseball bat into Mandy's vagina and removed the skin from her vagina and placed it on her face. Rita's breasts were cut off, she was stabbed 31 times, and "her genital area had been excised and was stuffed into her mouth". Huffman and her daughter were both found in their East Wenatchee, Washington home, sexually mutilated and posed in provocative positions.

Spillman's black pickup truck matched the description of a vehicle seen in a parking lot near the victims' home on the night of the murder. Also, Spillman's pickup was stopped by an East Wenatchee police officer in the parking lot of a VFW hall nearby that evening, and subsequently, a 12-inch knife covered in blood was recovered there. It appeared to match a knife set in the victims' house. Before his arrest, Spillman was kept under surveillance for a week while laboratory tests were performed.

Under threat of the death penalty, Spillman later would admit to killing Davis, of Tonasket, Washington. Six months after her September 1994 disappearance, her body had been found in a shallow grave some twelve miles from her home. She also had been posed in a provocative position. It was later discovered the victim's body had been exhumed by Spillman after her death and used for necrophilic rape before being buried again.

To avoid a possible death sentence, Spillman pleaded guilty to three counts of first degree murder in 1996. He was sentenced to life in prison for the Huffman murders and 45½ years for Penny Davis's murder. He is serving his sentence at Washington State Penitentiary.

=== Criminal history ===
According to court documents, "Spillman would declare to [cellmate Mark] Miller that he wanted to be the world’s greatest serial killer". At the time that he pleaded guilty to the three murders, reports stated that Spillman was facing additional charges of first-degree rape, robbery, and burglary. He and a friend were arrested for sexual assault in 1993 in Kent, Washington, but those charges were eventually dropped.

Spillman later told a cellmate that he stalked his victims prior to killing them as he imagined himself as a werewolf. He claimed his fantasies depicted him as "stalking his prey".

== In the media ==
The case was covered by two Investigation Discovery TV shows:

- In 2015 Most Evil analyzed his crimes in an episode titled "Predators". He was ranked at level 22, the highest rank on the scale.
- In 2020 Spillman's two sisters (April Steele and May Sullivan) told their experiences about "Roy" in an episode of Evil Lives Here.

== See also ==
- List of serial killers in the United States
