= Jeffrey Lundgren =

American cult leader and mass murderer (1950–2006)

Jeffrey Don Lundgren
- Born: May 3, 1950; Independence, Missouri, U.S.
- Died: October 24, 2006 (aged 56); Southern Ohio Correctional Facility, Ohio, U.S.
- Occupation: Cult leader
- Spouse: Alice Keeler
- Children: 4
- Status: Executed by lethal injection
- Motive: Mormon fundamentalism
- Convictions: Aggravated murder (5 counts); Kidnapping (5 counts)
- Penalty: Death (September 26, 1990)

Details
- Date: April 17, 1989
- Country: United States
- Location: Kirtland, Ohio
- Target: Avery family
- Killed: 5
- Date apprehended: January 7, 1990

Jeffrey Don Lundgren (May 3, 1950 – October 24, 2006) was an American self-proclaimed prophet, cult leader, and mass murderer who, on April 17, 1989, killed a family of five in Kirtland, Ohio. Lundgren led a Reorganized Church of Jesus Christ of Latter Day Saints movement-based cult and interpreted scripture using an unconventional version of chiasmus, which involved searching a text for recurring patterns.

In 1989 Lundgren and several of his followers murdered the Avery family, fellow members of his cult, for which he was convicted and sentenced to death. He was executed in 2006.

== Background ==
Jeffrey Lundgren was born on May 3, 1950, in Independence, Missouri, and grew up as a member of the Reorganized Church of Jesus Christ of Latter Day Saints (RLDS Church, now known as the Community of Christ). According to Lundgren, as well as some of his former neighbors, he was severely abused as a child, particularly by his father. Lundgren was, by most accounts, a loner when he was in middle and high school. He became an expert hunter when he began to spend time with his father as a teenager, becoming knowledgeable in the use and maintenance of firearms.

Lundgren enrolled at Central Missouri State University and spent time at a house that was specially built for RLDS youth. While at the house, he became friends with Alice Keeler and Keith Johnson. Keeler, who had also been abused by her father, quickly bonded with Lundgren, and the couple married in 1970. On December 2, 1970, the couple's first child, a boy, was born. By 1974, Keeler was pregnant for the second time.

Lundgren enlisted in the United States Navy the same year as his marriage. Prior to receiving an honorable discharge at the end of his first term of duty, he sought an early release arguing that his presence was necessary for the sustenance of his family. The Navy did not agree and denied his application. Lundgren received an honorable discharge days before his four-year enlistment was completed. His second son was born soon afterward.

Lundgren and his new family settled in San Diego, California, after his discharge, but economic problems forced the Lundgrens to move back to Missouri. In 1979, Keeler gave birth to a third child, a daughter. People close to the couple claim that Lundgren seemed frustrated by the family's money problems and generally tired of his wife; he allegedly became abusive after the birth of his daughter. According to hospital records, Keeler was hospitalized for a ruptured spleen, which may have been caused by Lundgren pushing her into a closet door handle. In 1980, the couple had their fourth child, another boy.

In 1987, Lundgren was dismissed as a lay minister by the RLDS Church due to suspicions he had kept donations given to him which were intended for the church.

== Religious activities ==
While Lundgren was living in a church-owned home in Kirtland, Ohio, he volunteered as a tour guide at the RLDS Church's historic Kirtland Temple next door. In this capacity, he began to teach the concept of "dividing the word", known as "chiastic interpretation" or "chiasmus", to interpret scriptures. Chiasmus is the use of repetitive structures in writing or speech. Lundgren falsely claimed to have created this interpretative method, which has actually been used for centuries and probably originated in antiquity to aid in memory for oral literature. The foundation of Lundgren's claim was that in everything created by God, the right side is a mirror image and, therefore, scripture had to be interpreted using that same method. Lundgren cited the Kirtland Temple as an example because the right side was a mirror image of the left side. To apply this concept to scripture, one takes a sentence from scripture; if the sentences before and after are consistent, the center sentence is the "truth"; when the sentences before and after conflict, the center sentence is a lie. These teachings of scriptural interpretations by Lundgren attracted followers. He claimed that he moved to Ohio because the word "OHIO" is "chiastic". Lundgren was asked to leave the Kirtland house around 1987, and his job as tour guide was terminated due to suspicions of theft.

Lundgren and his family moved to a rented farmhouse located at 8671 Chardon Road on U.S. Route 6, east of Ohio State Route 306. At that time, some followers started to move into his new home. Among these followers were Kevin Currie, Richard Brand, Greg Winship, Sharon Bluntschly, Daniel Kraft, and Debbie Olivarez. Ronald and Susan Luff, Dennis and Tonya Patrick, and Dennis and Cheryl Avery maintained their own residences. Some of his followers had known Lundgren in Missouri, while others were drawn to Lundgren at the Kirtland Temple. While Lundgren was living at the farmhouse, he began to practice methods which were consistent with Robert Lifton's criteria for mind control. For example, cult members were forbidden to talk amongst themselves; doing so was a sin, called "murmuring". Lundgren would eavesdrop on cult members to cause them to believe that he could read their minds.

On April 23, 1988, a neighbor told Kirtland police officer Ron Andolsek that she suspected that a cult was living at the farmhouse, and that Lundgren's son warned the neighbor's children that the earth would open up and demons would emerge on May 15. On April 28, 1988, a former cult member, referred by the FBI, contacted Kirtland Police and reported a conspiracy by the cult to take over the Kirtland Temple. Kirtland's police chief, Dennis T. Yarborough, did not believe the informant's information and, on May 2, 1988, confronted Lundgren at Kirtland police station. When Lundgren left, Yarborough said that he "neutralized the situation" by warning Lundgren that there were complaints about gunfire on Lundgren's property. Lundgren went back to his followers and called off the temple takeover, planned for May 3, because he had purportedly spoken to a higher power. Kirtland police initiated surveillance of his residence and of church-owned properties. In September 1988, a second informant came forward. Officer Andolsek cultivated the informant and made contact with the FBI and the ATF. The FBI initiated a domestic terrorism investigation.

On October 10, 1988, the day that Lundgren was excommunicated from the RLDS Church, there was a thunderstorm at the south end of Kirtland. When the sun emerged, a large rainbow appeared to the east. Lundgren told his followers that the rainbow signified the opening of the "Seven Seals". Lundgren and his family soon abandoned the group, and he claimed he began to feel a call to teach the Bible in the way he understood it. He formed his own splinter group soon after; its membership never exceeded twenty. This group was largely composed of conservative RLDS members who believed that God communicated through regular revelations, although some members admitted that they claimed to have revelations even when they did not. They were also opposed to more liberal rights for women in the RLDS Church, which contributed to their decision to join the new sect. Keeler told followers that she had once had a revelation that she would meet an important leader of the RLDS Church, concluding that this alleged revelation referred to Lundgren.

Lundgren began to offer Bible study sessions at his home. There, he would dominate the sessions, intimidate anyone who did not agree with his interpretations of scripture, and later encourage others to intimidate those who disagreed as well. Lundgren sought to convince his sect that he was God's last prophet. He asked for money from his supporters, some of whom would give him their life's savings, which often were calculated to be thousands of dollars. He then proclaimed he had received a call from God to move to Kirtland, where he and his supporters would soon witness the second coming of Christ on May 3 (Lundgren's birthday, no year specified) at the Kirtland Temple. Lundgren told his followers that it would be necessary to seize the Temple by force and hold it for the momentous event. The conspiracy involved burglarizing adjacent church-homes and committing murder as part of the takeover. He called the land around the temple "The Vineyards", which had to be "redeemed" or "cleansed" for him and his followers to take the temple.

By this time, seven of Lundgren's twelve followers had moved into his family's farmhouse. The remaining five were members of Dennis Avery's family. Lundgren felt that the Averys were committing a sin by not living in his house. Avery, who had sold his Missouri house in order for his family to move to Ohio, believed in and trusted Lundgren. Lundgren, however, considered Avery to be weak and, when he was no longer useful to Lundgren, he began talking about Avery behind his back. Lundgren often used Avery as a scapegoat for the sect's troubles, even though he was one of its biggest financial contributors. Avery decided to set apart a relatively small amount of money for his family's use, with a bank account. Once again, Lundgren considered this a sin because he wanted all of his followers' money to be given exclusively to him.

In time, Lundgren convinced his followers that they had to seize the temple, from which he had stolen about $40,000, and to kill anyone who stood in their way. He changed his mind, however, and started telling his followers that they had to kill a family of five instead if they wanted to see God. As punishment for their "disloyalty", he chose the Averys. At some point, he referred to the slaughter of the Avery family as "pruning the vineyard".

== Murders ==
On April 10, 1989, Lundgren ordered two of his followers to dig a pit in the barn in anticipation of burying the Averys' bodies there. The expectation was that there could be five bodies buried in the pit. Lundgren told the rest of his followers, including the Averys, that they would go on a wilderness trip. On April 17, he rented a motel room and had dinner with all of his followers. He then called his group's men into his room. He questioned each as to their purpose in the action. All of the men assured Lundgren that they were with him in the sacrifice. Dennis Avery was not invited to the meeting in Lundgren's room.

According to followers' admissions, Lundgren later went inside the barn with a church member named Ron Luff, luring Avery into a place where the other men waited by asking him for help with equipment for the camping trip. Luff attempted to render Avery unconscious with a stun gun, but due to a malfunction, a stun bullet struck Avery but failed to knock him out. Avery then was gagged and dragged to the place where Lundgren waited. He was shot twice in the back, dying almost instantly. To mask the sound of the gun, a chainsaw was left running. Luff then told Avery's wife, Cheryl, that her husband needed help. She was gagged like her husband, but also had duct tape put over her eyes, and dragged to Lundgren. She was shot three times, twice in the breasts and once in the abdomen. Her body lay next to her husband's. The Averys' 15-year-old daughter, Trina, was shot twice in the head. The first shot entered but ricocheted off of her skull, missing her brain, but the second killed her instantly. Thirteen-year-old Becky Avery was shot twice and left to die, while six-year-old Karen Avery was shot in the chest and head.

The barn where the incident took place was demolished on November 13, 2007. The New Promise Church now stands on the property, which the congregation bought for $350,000.

== Arrest and conviction ==
On April 18, 1989, the day after the murders, officers coincidentally came to Lundgren's farm to talk to him. After this encounter, he became paranoid about being caught and left Ohio with the rest of his cult, moving south to West Virginia. As months went by and nothing happened, Lundgren became disillusioned, and he and his family moved to California, leaving the rest of the surviving cult members behind in West Virginia.

Nine months after the killings, on January 3, 1990, a tip from an informant led police back to the long-abandoned farm, where the five bodies of the Avery family were uncovered. The Lundgrens became fugitives, media attention increased, and police began to track the cult members, with the FBI joining in the manhunt. Eventually, law enforcement located Lundgren's abandoned followers, who helped authorities track down their former leader. Thirteen members of Lundgren's sect were arrested in early 1990, including Lundgren and his wife.

After the guilty verdicts, Lundgren was given the death penalty. Alice received five life sentences (150 years to life) for conspiracy, complicity and kidnapping, while their son, Damon, was sentenced to 120 years to life. Luff, the key planner and facilitator of the murders with Lundgren, was sentenced to 170 years to life. Daniel Kraft was sentenced to 50 years to life. Five of the cult members were released in 2010 or early 2011, after roughly 20 years of incarceration (including pre-trial period). Prosecutor Charles Coulson confirmed that the original plea agreements meant that the five were to be eligible for release "at the earliest possible time", but the Ohio State Parole Board had repeatedly denied earlier requests for parole by Richard Brand and Greg Winship (both were serving 15 years to life), as well as Sharon Bluntschly, Debbie Olivarez and Susan Luff (all were serving 7 to 25 years). Lundgren followers Kathryn Johnson, Tonya Patrick and Dennis Patrick were determined not to have been involved in the murders, and each received a one-year sentence for obstruction of justice (the Patricks' sentences were suspended).

=== Execution ===
The Ohio Supreme Court set October 24, 2006, as Lundgren's execution date, and according to the state attorney general's office, as of August 2006, he had exhausted his appeals.

On October 17, 2006, Judge Gregory L. Frost issued an order temporarily delaying Lundgren's execution. Lundgren attempted to join a lawsuit with five other Ohio death row inmates challenging the state's death penalty law, claiming that due to his obesity, the lethal injection would be particularly painful and amount to cruel and unusual punishment. State Attorney General Jim Petro appealed to the United States Court of Appeals for the Sixth Circuit in Cincinnati. The 6th Circuit Court of Appeals issued an order allowing the execution to go forward. The U.S. Supreme Court refused a last-minute request to stop his execution, and Governor Bob Taft also denied clemency.

On October 24, 2006, Jeffrey Lundgren was executed at the Southern Ohio Correctional Facility in Lucasville. His last meal consisted of turkey, potatoes and gravy, a salad, and pumpkin pie. Since he was executed in the morning, he was also offered a cup of coffee, two cups of juice and two cups of milk, Rice Krispies, three pancakes, and three servings of syrup. Jeffrey declined the coffee and the syrup. To the near end, he had believed he could win a stay of execution. He was so convinced he would win a stay that he spent most of the morning napping. When he realized that he would indeed be executed, he started crying as he talked to his wife. Jeffrey's last words were "For my last words I'd like to profess my love for God, my family, my children and my beloved Kathy (Lundgren had married Kathryn Johnson after his conviction). ... I am because you are."

Nobody claimed Lundgren's body, so he was buried in the prison cemetery.

== See also ==
- List of people executed in Ohio
- List of people executed in the United States in 2006
