= Martha Ann Johnson =

American serial killer

- Born: 1955 (age 70–71); Georgia, U.S.
- Other name: Martha Ann Bowen
- Status: Paroled
- Conviction: Murder
- Penalty: Life imprisonment

Details
- Victims: 1–4
- Span of crimes: 1977–1982
- Country: United States
- State: Georgia
- Date apprehended: July 3, 1989

Martha Ann Johnson (also known as Martha Ann Bowen) (born 1955) is an American suspected serial killer from Georgia convicted of smothering to death one of her children in 1982, and suspected of smothering to death three of her other children between 1977 and 1982.

== Murders ==
By the age of 22, Johnson was on her third marriage. Her first marriage produced a girl, born in 1971. Her second marriage produced a son in 1975 and her third marriage, to Earl Bowen, produced a son and daughter, born 1979 and 1980, respectively.

On September 25, 1977, Johnson claimed her 23-month-old James William Taylor was unresponsive when she attempted to wake him up from his nap. He was rushed to the hospital, where he was pronounced dead. The cause of death was determined to be sudden infant death syndrome (SIDS).

On November 30, 1980, Johnson claimed her three-month-old daughter Tabitha Jenelle Bowen was blue when she went to wake her up from a nap. Paramedics were unable to revive Tabitha, and her death was also attributed to SIDS.

In January 1981, 2-year-old Earl Wayne Bowen was found with a package of rat poison. He was treated and released from the hospital, after which his parents claimed he began to have seizures. On February 12, 1981, Earl went into cardiac arrest while being taken to the hospital during a seizure. He was revived and placed on life support; however, doctors pronounced him brain dead, and he was removed from life support three days later.

Johnson claimed her 11-year-old daughter Jenny Ann Wright was complaining of chest pains, for which a doctor prescribed Tylenol and a rib belt. On February 21, 1982, paramedics found Jenny Ann face down on Johnson's bed with foam coming out of her mouth, but were unable to resuscitate her. An autopsy indicated that Jenny Ann had died of asphyxia.

Johnson and Bowen separated permanently, and Johnson remarried.

== Arrest, confession and conviction ==
In December 1989, an article in The Atlanta Constitution questioned the deaths, and the cases were reopened. Investigators determined that each child's death was preceded seven to 10 days by marital problems between Johnson and Bowen.

On July 3, 1989, Johnson was arrested, and she confessed to killing two of her children. After confrontations with Bowen, Johnson would suffocate the children by rolling her 250-pound body on them as they slept. She claimed the motive was to punish her husband. Johnson claimed she was not responsible for the deaths of her two youngest children.

By the beginning of her trial in April 1990, Johnson had retracted her confession. On May 5, 1990, she was convicted of murder for the smothering death of one of her children and sentenced to life in prison. She was housed at Pulaski State Prison before being granted parole on March 23, 2020. Martha's life and murders are the basis for a novel, "Underneath" by Lily Hoang, published in 2021 by Red Hen Press.

== See also ==
- List of serial killers in the United States

== Bibliography ==
- Douglas, John E.; Burgess, Allen G.; Ressler, Robert K. (2006). "Case Study 122.01: Spontaneous Domestic Homicide". Crime Classification Manual: A Standard System for Investigating and Classifying Violent Crimes. Wiley. ISBN 978-0-7879-8501-1.
