= Eric Beishline =

American murderer and suspected serial killer

- Born: Eric John Beishline; 1965 (age 60–61); Hobart, Indiana, U.S.
- Conviction: Murder
- Penalty: Life imprisonment without parole (Norton murder); 20-years-to-life (Hoech assault); 15 years imprisonment (Hoech burglary)

Details
- Victims: 1–3
- Span of crimes: 1992–1993
- Country: United States
- State: Missouri
- Date apprehended: January 9, 1993

Eric John Beishline (born 1965) is an American murderer and suspected serial killer implicated in the murders of three elderly people in Missouri from 1992 to 1993. Beishline, a drug addict, was convicted of one of the murders and sentenced to life imprisonment.

== Early life ==
Eric John Beishline was born in 1965 in Hobart, Indiana, the second of three children of an upper-middle-class family. His father Larry worked in medical sales, while his mother Joyce owned several funeral homes. Beishline grew up in Crown Point and later graduated from a private Catholic high school in 1982.

During the mid-to-late 1980s, he began a relationship with a young woman and enrolled in Purdue University; however, he attended only sporadically and spent most of his time doing drugs and drinking alcohol. Beishline eventually dropped out and moved to Anaheim, California, where his drug addiction worsened to the point where he joined two drug treatment programs and Alcoholics Anonymous. In 1985, he was arrested by the police in Fullerton on a burglary charge but was let off with a reduced charge of petty theft, receiving two years of mandatory supervision. Two years later, he enrolled in the Orange Coast College, improved his grades, and attempted to rekindle his relationship with his ex-girlfriend.

Feeling that he was a changed man, the woman accepted, leading to Beishline moving to St. Louis and enrolling at the Saint Louis University's pre-medical program. During his time there, Beishline was well regarded by friends and acquaintances and was noted for his friendliness and religiosity. Between April and August 1989, he worked as a waiter at the Cardwell's Restaurant and Bar in Clayton, where most employees found him to be charming while others characterized him as a cocky womanizer.

== Downward spiral ==
By the summer of 1989, Beishline had returned to his old habits, dropping out of several classes and experiencing blackouts on at least one occasion. In November, his girlfriend successfully filed for a restraining order after he started harassing and stalking her and even tampered with her car. Soon after, he moved to the University of Missouri, where he attempted to break into a faculty room to get the answers for a Spanish test. As a result, in May 1990, Beishline pleaded guilty to burglary and received five years of probation.

Unaware of his legal charges, the Missouri Division of Insurance issued a license to Beishline, authorizing him to sell insurance. In June 1990, he contracted with Barnes Insurance Group and was tasked with selling insurance policies to the elderly. Despite his newfound job, Beishline continued getting into legal trouble and in March 1991 was arrested in Osage Beach for a DUI. He again pleaded guilty and was ordered to pay a $650 fine.

Over the next couple of months, Beishline continued abusing alcohol and drugs and was eventually fired from his job. He then contacted an independent insurance agent, David Kruger, and was allowed to sell insurance through his company. Over the next couple of months, Beishline started pestering various elderly people in attempts to scam them out of their money.

== Crimes ==
On January 7, 1993, Beishline went to the Warrenton home of 84-year-old Evelyn Hoech in an attempt to sell her some annuities. Hoech refused and eventually started yelling at him to leave, prompting Beishline to pull a gun on her and push her to the ground, threatening to shoot her in the head. He then pressed a rag coated in chloroform to make her fall unconscious and turned on the stove in an attempt to suffocate her. However, as the stove was unlightened, Hoech eventually woke up and managed to recover from her injuries.

On January 9, 72-year-old Anna Elizabeth Norton disappeared from her home in Troy. Her body was later found on January 15 on a bank of the Missouri River near Columbia. As it was later determined she was suffocated to death, her daughter concluded that she must have trusted her killer, as Norton - who suffered from polio - was wary of strangers.

== Arrest and investigation ==
On the same day Norton disappeared, her purse was found in Beishline's car. He was detained, but despite potentially incriminating evidence being found in his possession, he was not immediately charged with Norton's murder. Instead, he was detained on charges of insurance fraud, first-degree burglary, and related charges in two counties, following a tip from an elderly woman he had attempted to defraud back in December 1991. While he was being searched, Beishline became enraged and started trashing the room he was in, leading to an additional charge of resisting arrest.

Due to the fact that he had hundreds of printouts containing information about people he had scammed and even murdered, authorities from 18 counties across the state organized to look into any potential victims. In order to gather more information, the Missouri State Highway Patrol opened a temporary 800 number for citizens to call anonymously if they suspected that they had been defrauded by Beishline or had a recently deceased relative who was known to be in contact with him.

== Trials ==
=== Assault on Evelyn Hoech ===
Beishline's first trial, for the assault on Hoech, concluded in January 1994 after he pleaded guilty to the charges of first-degree assault and burglary. Due to his plea, he was sentenced to a life term with a chance of parole after 20 years imprisonment, with an additional 15 years to be served concurrently for the burglary charge.

=== Murder of Elizabeth Norton ===
Beishline's next trial was for the murder of Elizabeth Norton, which began in March 1993. Throughout the initial proceedings, prosecutor Kevin Crane presented the jury with a suitcase containing various items used in the crimes, ranging from Beishline's handgun to printed out maps showing the layout of Troy and Warrenton. Crane argued that the Norton murder was premeditated and warranted the death penalty. In response to this tactic, Beishline's public defender Daniel Gralike stated that his client suffered from a cocaine-induced psychosis and committed the murder in an act of recklessness.

The most notable witness called during the trial was Beishline's father, Larry, who was called by the defense team. In his testimony, Larry mentioned the numerous times he had advised his son to undergo serious drug rehabilitation treatment after his prison stints, but that Eric always fell back into his old ways of smoking marijuana and cocaine. On March 9, Beishline was convicted of Norton's murder, with jury having to make a decision to either sentence him to death or to life imprisonment without parole.

==== Sentencing phase ====
During the sentencing phase, Crane attempted to convince the jury to be in favor of the death sentence by attempting to link Beishline to two other suspicious deaths. The first was that of 86-year-old Irene Miller, from whom Beishline attempted to cash in a stolen check of $5,000 on December 17, 1992. When the bank notified him that they needed Miller's signature, Beishline said that he would go fetch her - fifteen minutes later, he returned claiming that she was not home. Some time afterwards, Miller was found dead inside her home in Fulton, with the official cause of death listed as a heart attack brought about by exposure to chloroform. The other suspicious death was of a 78-year-old man named Herbet Bellman, who was found dead inside his home in Cole County in August 1992.

In response to this, multiple members of Beishline's family pleaded with the jury to spare his life, sharing with them instances of his doing good deeds when he was younger, such as saving a young girl from drowning. In the end, Beishline was spared the death penalty and was sentenced to life imprisonment without a chance for parole.

== See also ==
- List of serial killers in the United States
