= Archie McCafferty =

Australian serial killer (1949–2024)

- Born: Archibald Beattie McCafferty; 1949; Glasgow, Scotland
- Died: 2024 (aged 74); Edinburgh, Scotland
- Other name: Mad Dog

Details
- Victims: 4
- Country: Australia

Archibald Beattie McCafferty (1949–2024) was a Scottish-born Australian serial killer. He was described as the Australian Charles Manson. Archie McCafferty was born in Scotland and emigrated to Australia when he was 10.

In 1973, while living in Australia, McCafferty murdered 3 people, claiming his dead baby son told him to murder people. In 1974, he was imprisoned in Tamworth Correctional Centre and while in prison he murdered an inmate.

In 1997 McCafferty was deported to Scotland. He died from a fall in 2024, at the age of 74. At the time, he was suffering from COVID-19, COPD, pneumonia and acute kidney failure. News of his death went unreported until July 2025.
