= Arthur Shawcross =

American serial killer (1945–2008)

- Mug shot of Shawcross
- Born: Arthur John Shawcross; June 6, 1945; Kittery, Maine, U.S.
- Died: November 10, 2008 (aged 63); Albany Medical Center, Sullivan Correctional Facility, Fallsburg, New York, U.S.
- Other names: The Genesee River Killer; The Monster of the Rivers; The Rochester Strangler
- Height: 6 ft 0 in (1.83 m)
- Convictions: Arson; Burglary; Manslaughter (1 count); Second degree murder (11 counts)
- Penalty: Life imprisonment without parole (or a term amounting to 250 years)

Details
- Victims: 14
- Span of crimes: May 7, 1972 – December 28, 1989
- Country: United States
- State: New York
- Date apprehended: January 5, 1990

Arthur John Shawcross (June 6, 1945 – November 10, 2008), also known as the Genesee River Killer, was an American serial killer active in Rochester, New York, between 1972 and 1989. Shawcross's first known murders took place in his hometown of Watertown, New York, where he killed a young boy and a girl. Under the terms of a plea bargain, he was allowed to plead guilty to one charge of manslaughter for those two 1972 murders, for which he served 14 years of a 25-year sentence.

Shawcross killed most of his victims in 1988 and 1989 after being granted an early parole; the granting of that early parole later led to controversy. A food service worker, he trawled the streets of Rochester in his girlfriend's car looking for prostitutes to kill. Shawcross died on 10 November 2008, while serving a prison sentence of 250 years for his 1980s crimes, at the age of 63.

Michael H. Stone, a professor of psychiatry at Columbia University and an authority on violent behavior, identified Shawcross's early parole as "one of the most egregious examples of the unwarranted release of a prisoner" in his book The Anatomy of Evil.

== Early life ==
Arthur Shawcross was born in Kittery, Maine, on June 6, 1945, the first of four children to Arthur Roy Shawcross and Elizabeth "Bessie" ("Betty") Yerakes Shawcross. His family moved to Watertown, New York, when he was young.

Throughout his childhood, Shawcross was a frequent bed-wetter. He later claimed his mother performed oral sex on him for several years starting when he was aged 7, and that during junior high school he had sexual relations with his sister. Shawcross had a reputation at school as a bully and would frequently act out violently. He dropped out of high school in 1960.

In April 1967, at age 21, Shawcross was drafted into the United States Army. At this time, he divorced his first wife and gave up his rights to their 18-month-old son, whom he never saw again. He served one tour of duty with the 4th Supply and Transport Company of the 4th Infantry Division in Vietnam. He later boasted of grotesque combat exploits, such as "beheading mama-sans and nailing their heads to trees as a warning to the Vietcong" and engaging in cannibalism; in reality, he never served in a combat position.

After the war, Shawcross was stationed at Fort Sill in Lawton, Oklahoma, as an armorer. His second wife Linda experienced several aspects of his disturbing behavior, especially his penchant for starting fires; an Army psychiatrist told her that Shawcross derived sexual arousal from setting fires.

== Return to New York ==
After his discharge from the Army, Shawcross moved with Linda from Oklahoma to Clayton, New York. Linda would soon divorce him, after which he began committing crimes such as arson and burglary. Shawcross's offenses earned him a five-year sentence at Attica Correctional Facility, and later Auburn Correctional Facility. After serving 22 months, he was granted an early release in October 1971, in part due to his role in the rescue of a correctional officer during a prison riot. Shawcross returned to his hometown of Watertown, New York, eventually getting a job with the Watertown Public Works Department and marrying for the third time.

On May 7, 1972, he raped and killed his first known victim, 10-year-old Jack Owen Blake, after luring the boy into a wooded area in Watertown. Blake's body was not found until authorities received a tip by telephone on September 5. On September 2, just prior to the body's discovery, Shawcross raped and killed eight-year-old Karen Ann Hill, who had been visiting Watertown with her mother for the Labor Day weekend. He was arrested the next day.

A grand jury indicted Shawcross for murder in Hill's death. On October 17, 1972, he was allowed to plead guilty to a lesser charge of first degree manslaughter for both deaths and was sentenced to an indeterminate term with a maximum of 25 years at Attica Correctional Facility. In November he was transferred to Green Haven Correctional Facility.

Jefferson County District Attorney William McClusky explained the plea bargain by stating that other than Shawcross's confession to police, there was no direct evidence linking him to the Blake killing. McClusky also suggested Shawcross could have argued at trial that he was under "extreme emotional disturbance", and a jury would have been likely to arrive at a verdict of manslaughter.

After Shawcross was in prison for fourteen years, inexperienced prison staff and social workers concluded that Shawcross was "no longer dangerous", disregarding the warnings of psychiatrists who had assessed Shawcross as a "schizoid psychopath". He was released on parole in April 1987.

Shawcross had difficulty settling down, as neighbors would protest his presence and employers would refuse to hire him. He first moved to Binghamton, New York, then relocated to Delhi with a girlfriend, Rose Marie Walley. When Delhi residents became aware of Shawcross' presence, the couple moved to nearby Fleischmanns, only to be met with hostility there as well. In late June 1987, Shawcross' parole officer moved him and Walley into a transient hotel in Rochester, but failed to notify local authorities of this action. In mid-October, Shawcross and Walley found more permanent lodgings at 241 Alexander Street in Rochester.

== Second series of murders ==
In March 1988, Shawcross began murdering again, primarily targeting sex workers in the Rochester area, before his capture less than two years later. He was convicted of eleven murders, with a twelfth not officially ascribed to him. The victims were:

#	Name	Age	Disappeared	Discovered
1.	Dorothy "Dottie" Blackburn	27	March 18, 1988	March 24, 1988
2.	Anna Marie Steffen	28	July 9, 1988	September 11, 1988
3.	Dorothy Keeler	59	July 29, 1989	October 21, 1989
4.	Patricia "Patty" Ives	25	September 29, 1989	October 27, 1989
5.	June Stott	30	October 23, 1989	November 23, 1989
6.	Marie Welch	22	November 5, 1989	January 5, 1990
7.	Frances "Franny" Brown	22	November 11, 1989	November 15, 1989
8.	Kimberly Logan	30	November 15, 1989	November 15, 1989
9.	Elizabeth "Liz" Gibson	29	November 25, 1989	November 27, 1989
10.	Darlene Trippi	32	December 15, 1989	January 5, 1990
11.	June Cicero	33	December 17, 1989	January 3, 1990
12.	Felicia Stephens	20	December 28, 1989	December 31, 1989

All the victims were murdered in Monroe County except for Gibson, who was killed in neighboring Wayne County. Retired detective Robert Keppel has argued that the detectives investigating the case over-relied on the concept of modus operandi, at times searching for multiple suspects due to small differences in the profiles of each victim.

On January 5, 1990, two days after June Cicero's body was discovered by aerial surveillance, police arrested Shawcross. He had been spotted by an eyewitness and a police surveillance team standing near his car, apparently masturbating on a bridge over Salmon Creek near where Cicero's body had been dumped.

== Trial and conviction ==
In November 1990, Shawcross was tried by Monroe County First Assistant District Attorney Charles J. Siragusa for the ten murders in Monroe County. He pleaded not guilty by reason of insanity, with testimony from forensic psychiatrist Dorothy Lewis that he had brain damage, multiple personality disorder (now known as dissociative identity disorder) and post-traumatic stress disorder, and had been sexually abused as a child. Lewis also claimed that Shawcross moved into a separate internal personality named "Bessie" when he killed, arguing for him to be institutionalized rather than being returned to the prison system.

In response to the defense's claim that Shawcross's actions were the product of post-traumatic stress disorder resulting from his war service, FBI criminal profiler Robert K. Ressler reviewed the claim on behalf of the prosecution before the trial. Ressler wrote that "[Shawcross's] claim of having witnessed wartime atrocities was patently outrageous and untrue." Prosecution psychiatrist Dr. Park Dietz testified that Shawcross had antisocial personality disorder. It was later determined that Shawcross had a cyst pressing on the temporal lobe of his brain, as well as scarring on his frontal lobes – areas that are responsible for decision-making and self-control.

== Imprisonment ==
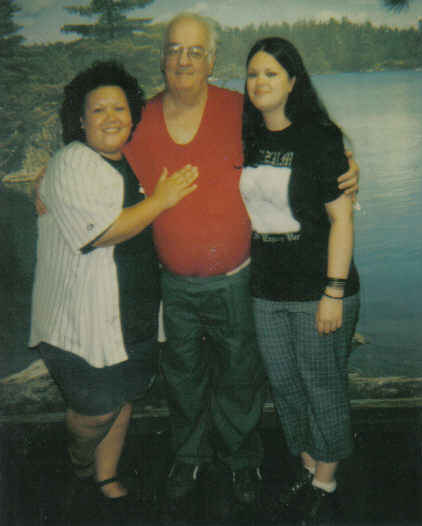
Shawcross with his daughter (left) and granddaughter at the Sullivan Correctional Facility, 2002

Shawcross was incarcerated at the Sullivan Correctional Facility in Fallsburg, New York, where he was held until his death.

In 2003, Shawcross was interviewed by British reporter Katherine English for a documentary on cannibalism. He bragged about slicing out and eating the vulvae of three victims, but refused to discuss his earlier claim of eating the genitals of his first victim, Jack Blake.

== Death ==
Officials said 63-year-old Shawcross complained of a pain in his leg on the afternoon of November 10, 2008. He was taken to Albany Medical Center where he went into cardiac arrest, and died shortly thereafter. He was pronounced dead at 9:50 p.m.

== See also ==
- List of incidents of cannibalism
- List of serial killers by number of victims
- List of serial killers in the United States

== Sources ==
- Ressler, Robert; Schactman, Tom (1992), Whoever Fights Monsters: My Twenty Years Hunting Serial Killers for the FBI, St. Martin's Press, ISBN 0-312-95044-6
- "Paroled Killer Charged Again". The Spokesman-Review. January 6, 1990.
- "Serial Killer Arthur Shawcross Dead". Rochester, NY: 13WHAM.com. November 8, 2008.
- "Upstate New York Serial Killer Dies". Associated Press. October 11, 2008. Archived from the original on July 19, 2011.
- Keppel, Robert; Birnes, William J. (2011). Signature Killers. Random House.
- Norris, Joel. (1992) Arthur Shawcross: The Genesee River Killer, Pinnacle Books, ISBN 1-55817-578-4
- Crime Library article on Arthur Shawcross
- WGBH Educational Foundation (1992). Mind of a Serial Killer (TV-Series). PBS Nova.
- "Democrat and Chronicle PhotoGallery".
