= David Elliott Penton =

American child molester and serial killer

- Born: David Elliott Penton; February 9, 1958 (age 68); Columbus, Ohio, U.S.
- Occupation: Mechanic
- Status: Incarcerated
- Motive: Pedophilia; Sexual sadism
- Convictions: Ohio; Aggravated murder Kidnapping; Texas; Murder (3 counts); Manslaughter
- Penalty: Life imprisonment

Details
- Victims: 5–9+
- Span of crimes: 1984–1988
- Country: United States
- States: Texas; Ohio; Indiana
- Date apprehended: 2020

David Elliott Penton (born February 9, 1958) is an American child molester and serial killer. Penton, an Ohio native and mechanic, was convicted of manslaughter in the child abuse death of his own infant son in 1984; during an appeal of his sentence, he fled and remained a fugitive until 1987, when he was charged and convicted with the murder of a friend's 9-year-old niece in Ohio.

Penton was extradited to Texas in 2003 and charged with the deaths of three young Dallas-area girls in the mid-1980s. He signed a plea agreement admitting to the murders. Officials in Texas and several other states are investigating the possibility he may be involved with other unsolved cases and suspect that he could be the most prolific child killer in American history.

== Early life and military service ==
David Penton was born an only child on February 9, 1958, in Columbus, Ohio and was raised by his mother after his father abandoned them when he was a child. After graduating high school he joined the U.S. Army in 1977 working as a track vehicle mechanic until 1984.

Penton was an expert marksman and soldier with an excellent record, who his commanding officer called "highly motivated." In 1980, he was charged with storing alcohol in his foot locker and several months later he was charged with lying about his marital status to obtain military benefits which resulted in him being demoted from a sergeant to a specialist.

When he was stationed in Korea during his service, Penton frequently solicited many prostitutes, some of whom were underage, and abused illegal narcotics, such as LSD and cocaine. "I'm not going to lie. I was with a lot of prostitutes and some of them could have been underage," he said. "But I didn't fancy little kids like the cops say. It wasn't so much that I fancied the age as it was about the cleanliness. I mean there were a lot of diseases out there."

== Victims ==
=== Confirmed ===
Between 1984 and 1988, Penton is believed to have been responsible for the deaths of at least five individuals. After killing his own son, he is believed to have subsequently murdered three girls in Dallas and another in Ohio. He is also suspected of one additional non-fatal abduction. He was charged with the kidnapping and aggravated murder in the Ohio case in 1988 and was convicted in 1990. In June 2003, he was indicted for murder in the deaths of the three Texas girls. He signed a plea deal to avoid a possible death sentence and pleaded guilty to all three cases in January 2005. He will remain imprisoned in the Ohio State Penitentiary until he finishes his sentence, where he is eligible for parole in 2027. Afterward, he will serve three consecutive life sentences in Texas.

- On November 23, 1984, while Penton was stationed at Fort Hood, he was charged with the death of his 2-month-old son, Michael James Penton, in Killeen, Texas in Bell County, Texas. A Bell County medical examiner told authorities that Penton violently shook him to death in a "fit of rage", because he would not stop crying. Penton pleaded guilty to manslaughter and received a five-year prison sentence from a judge and was also honourably discharged from the U.S. Army. While out on bond appealing his case, he fled from Texas authorities.
- Christi Lynn Meeks, 5, was abducted while outside her mother's apartment complex in Mesquite, Texas on January 19, 1985. She was playing hide-and-seek with her older brother who witnessed a man abduct her. On April 3, 1985, her body was found floating in Deer Haven Cove in Lake Texoma by two fisherman and she was identified two weeks later. She had been raped and strangled to death.
- On February 12, 1986, 10-year-old Tiffany Ibarra was walking to Bodie Elementary School in Corsicana, Texas when she was abducted and then released by a young white man who had grabbed her on the sidewalk and pulled her into his van. After Proctor's abduction, police detectives re-contacted Ibarra who described the suspect for a police sketch artist. She identified Penton when under hypnosis. His van also matched Ibarra's description of the van her abductor was driving.
- On February 15, 1986, Christie Dianne Proctor, 9, was reported missing in North Dallas by her family as she was walking from her apartment to a friend's house. She was presumably abducted en route and her skeletal remains were discovered beneath a mattress in a field in Plano, Texas on April 9, 1988.
- 4-year-old Roxann Hope Reyes was abducted behind her mother's home at the Meadow Terrace Apartments in Garland, Texas on November 3, 1987, while she was picking wildflowers for her. Her body was found on May 19, 1988, in a vacant lot located in Murphy, Texas. She had been sexually assaulted and strangled. A playmate saw her get into a grey, four-door Sedan with a man after he promised her ice cream and candy. It is believed that she thought Penton was her father's friend because he had been seen around the apartment complex.
- Nydra Anntionette Ross, 9, was reported missing from her aunt's home in Dayton, Ohio on March 31, 1988. Her remains were found in a dry creek bed in Marion, Ohio on September 15, 1988. She had been raped and strangled to death, and was last seen alive talking to Penton, a co-worker of her uncle who was visiting her aunt at the time in Columbus, Ohio. When Penton became a suspect in her disappearance, police seized his van and discovered traces of her blood on the floor.

=== Suspected ===
In 2007, authorities announced they considered Penton as a person of interest in the disappearances and murders of several other girls. He has made claims to killing more than 50 children but law enforcement suspect that the actual number is between 25 and 30.

- 2-year-old Amber Nicole Crum was last seen seated inside of a pickup truck in Dallas, Texas on December 26, 1983. It belonged to her mother's live-in boyfriend, James, and it was parked outside of McDonald's Grocery in the 800 block of Murdock Road, two blocks from their home, at 9:45am. James went inside the store for a few moments to run an errand; when he returned, Crum had disappeared.
- Angelica Maria Gandara, 11, was last seen in Temple, Texas between 5:00 and 5:30pm on July 14, 1985, inside a 1977 Chevrolet pickup truck. She was sighted in it approximately two blocks from her grandmother's residence and had been walking back to her family's home. She has not been seen since.
- Ara "Niecie" Denise Johnson, 5, was last seen in her bedroom in her family's mobile home in the 300 block of Boulder Street in Big Sandy, Texas on April 2, 1986, between 1:00 and 2:30am. The back door to the residence was open, and the dark orange bedspread under which she was sleeping went missing with her. Penton was known to be in the area at the time of her abduction and allegedly mentioned her case to a cellmate which prompted investigators to look into his possible involvement in her case.
- 6-year-old Shannon Marie Sherrill disappeared behind her family's trailer home in the 600 block of Plum Street in Thorntown, Indiana on October 5, 1986. She was playing a game of hide-and-seek with about ten other children at approximately 1:30pm before she went missing. Bloodhounds traced her scent to a nearby cornfield and cemetery, then lost the trail. Penton later told fellow inmates that he abducted and murdered her.

== See also ==
- List of serial killers in the United States
