= Michael H. Stone =

American psychiatrist (1933–2023)

- Stone in 2008
- Born: October 27, 1933; Syracuse, New York, U.S.
- Died: December 6, 2023 (aged 90); New York City, New York, U.S.
- Education: Cornell University
- Known for: Research on criminal behavior and host of the Investigation Discovery TV show Most Evil
- Scientific career
- Fields: Medicine; Forensic psychiatry

Michael H. Stone (October 27, 1933 – December 6, 2023) was an American psychiatrist and Professor of Clinical Psychiatry at the Columbia University College of Physicians and Surgeons in New York City.

== Early life and education ==
Michael H. Stone was born in Syracuse, New York, on October 27, 1933. He acquired his B.A. from Cornell University in 1954, where he was mentored by Professor Harry Caplan in Latin and Greek, and completed medical school at Cornell University in 1958. He was mentored by psychoanalyst Dr. Harold Searles from 1958 to 1963, and trained in hematology under Dr. Allyn Ley at Memorial Sloan-Kettering from 1961 to 1963. He completed training in the Columbia Psychoanalytic Institute in 1971, and from 1996 to 2000, was mentored in forensic psychiatry by Dr. Charles Smith.

== Research ==
Stone's work lent support to the need for flexibility in the therapeutic approach to treating borderline personality disorder, as advocated by Drs. John Livesley, John G. Gunderson and Thomas McGlashan. He described long-term follow-up of patients diagnosed with Borderline Personality Disorder, 25–50 years after initial contact. In 2017, the American Academy of Psychoanalysis and Dynamic Psychiatry awarded him for a paper describing treatment recommendations for persons with this condition.

Stone was also recognized for refining the concept of psychopathy, as described by Dr. Robert D. Hare and Dr. David Cooke. From 2006 to 2007, he was the host of the Discovery Channel’s Most Evil, a true crime program based upon the 22-point Gradations of Evil scale he developed to examine acts of violence which provoke the emotional reaction association commonly termed "evil". According to Stone, "evil" acts are generally shocking and horrible, bewildering, and premeditated, and involve wildly excessive degrees of suffering. His scale, which distinguished acts with more "human" motivations, such as crimes of self-defense and passion, from violence associated with various degrees of psychopathy and sadism, was formally described in his 2009 book The Anatomy of Evil in 2009 and further delineated alongside clinical psychologist Dr. Gary Brucato in its follow-up volume, The New Evil: Understanding the Emergence of Modern Violent Crime, in 2019.

== Death ==
Stone died on December 6, 2023, at his home in Manhattan, from complications of a stroke that he had suffered in January. He was 90.
