= David Owen Brooks =

American serial killer (1955–2020)

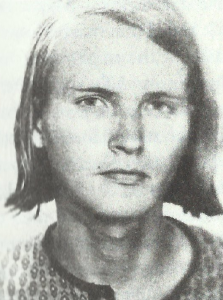
- Mug shot of Brooks, August 1973
- Born: February 12, 1955; Houston, Texas, U.S.
- Died: May 28, 2020 (aged 65); Galveston, Texas, U.S.
- Spouse: Bridget Clark (m. 1973; div. 1977)
- Children: 1 (deceased)
- Motive: Financial gain; self-preservation; loyalty; possible sadism
- Conviction: Murder with malice (1 count)
- Penalty: Life imprisonment

Details
- Victims: 1 (convicted)
- Span of crimes: December 13, 1970 – August 3, 1973
- Country: United States
- State: Texas
- Date apprehended: August 9, 1973

David Owen Brooks (February 12, 1955 – May 28, 2020) was an American convicted murderer and accomplice to murder convicted in 1975 of the murder of one of the twenty-nine known victims of the Houston Mass Murders, which occurred in Houston and Pasadena, Texas, between 1970 and 1973.

One of two known accomplices of Dean Corll, Brooks confessed to assisting in the abduction and burial of the victims, although he consistently denied having participated in their actual murder. The crimes came to light after Corll's other known accomplice, Elmer Wayne Henley, fatally shot Corll on August 8, 1973.

Tried in Houston in February 1975 for the June 1973 murder of 15-year-old William Ray Lawrence, Brooks was convicted and sentenced to life imprisonment on March 4. He did appeal his sentence, but his conviction was upheld in May 1979.

Brooks died of COVID-19 related complications in a Galveston hospital at the age of 65 on May 28, 2020, having served forty-five years of a life sentence.

At the time of their discovery, the Houston Mass Murders were considered the worst example of serial murder in American history.

== Childhood ==
David Owen Brooks was born in Houston, Texas, on February 12, 1955, the second of two sons born to Henry Alton and Mary (née Hetherington) Brooks.

Brooks's parents divorced when he was six years old. His mother, a nurse, retained custody of the children and later relocated to Beaumont, a city 85 miles (140 km) east of Houston before remarrying and permanently relocating to Tioga, Louisiana; his father—a paving contractor and World War II veteran—remained in Houston and subsequently married a woman named Jewel Aelene Dykes in September 1961. Both sons maintained contact with their father, stepmother, and younger half-sister, whom they frequently visited during holidays and summer vacations.

By his early teens, Brooks had become something of a petty thief. Following an incident in which he was discovered to have stolen a potbelly stove in a rural Louisiana parish, a county sheriff recommended he return to Houston to live with his father. His mother agreed, and Brooks permanently relocated to Houston in 1970, when he was 15. He seldom saw his mother again, and frequently clashed with his father, whom Brooks's attorney, Jim Skelton, would later describe as a redneck who "didn't really like" his younger son due to Brooks being a bespectacled, "sickly kid".

Brooks's grades declined after he began attending Hamilton Junior High School. Although as a preteen, he had typically achieved A, B and C grades, his frequent truanting and general lackadaisical attitude to his studies saw Brooks's grades fall to D's and F's. He enrolled in Waltrip High School in 1970, but would drop out after one year.

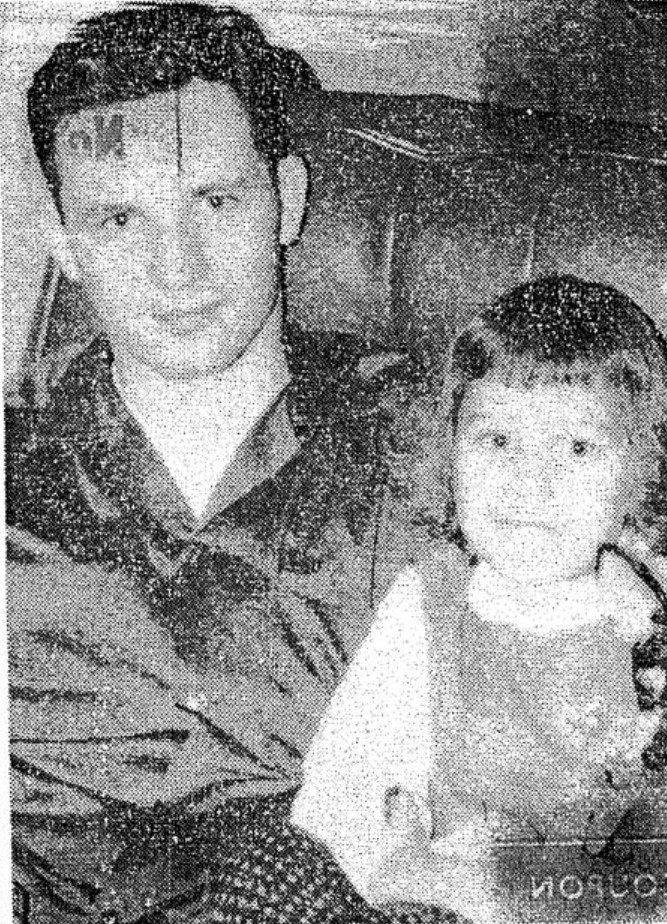
Corll, pictured with his half-sister approximately seven years prior to encountering Brooks

== Acquaintance with Dean Corll ==
Brooks befriended Dean Corll in 1967. At the time of their acquaintance, Corll was employed as vice-president at his family's candy firm in the Heights, Corll Candy Company, which was located directly across the street from Helms Elementary School. (Note: According to some sources, the Corll Candy Company had rebranded to Corll's Candy Kitchen by 1967.) Brooks was a 12-year-old sixth grade student at this school and one of the many local children to whom Corll gave free candy. He would later recollect of his initial impressions of Corll: "He would give candy to kids leaving school, which was across the street from the store. Also, he owned a motorcycle and would give kids rides and take some of the kids to the movies."

Brooks initially became one of Corll's many youthful companions. When visiting his father and grandmother in Houston, he regularly socialized with Corll and various adolescent boys who frequently congregated at the rear of the candy factory to play penny ante, listen to music, or play pool upon a table Corll had installed at the rear of the factory. He also joined Corll on the regular trips he took to South Texas beaches in the company of various youths, and later commented that Corll was the first adult male who did not mock his appearance. Whenever Brooks told Corll he needed cash, Corll gave him money, and the youth began to view Corll as something of a substitute father figure. By Brooks's own later admission, he began regarding Corll's apartment as his second home, and Corll—who by the late 1960s had begun frequently changing addresses—invariably provided accommodation for Brooks wherever he lived. This arrangement may initially have been in part due to the frequent clashes between Brooks and his father causing him to seek temporary refuge away from home.

=== Sexual relationship ===
By 1969, upon Corll's urging, a sexual relationship had developed between the two, with Corll paying Brooks in cash sums of up to $10 (the equivalent of approximately $88 as of 2026) or with gifts such as blacklight posters to allow him to perform fellatio upon him, although Brooks would later emphasize "it was always Dean doing something to me—never me doing anything to Dean". (Note: In a December 2006 prison interview with forensic anthropologist Dr. Sharon Derrick, Brooks would remark while reflecting on the sexual abuse which occurred during this stage of his relationship with Corll: "I wish I'd told my mother what he was doing to me. If I'd told her, I wouldn't be here now.")

Brooks gradually became aware Corll also engaged in paid sexual activity with numerous other boys who visited the various apartments in which he resided. He would later inform investigators: "He liked oral sex, and he'd pay boys to come over and let him do it to them. That was his sex life."

=== Initial discoveries ===
In approximately November 1970, Brooks entered an apartment Corll had recently rented at 3300 Yorktown unannounced to observe Corll nude and with two teenage boys whom Brooks did not know "strapped down" to a four-poster bed. According to Brooks's subsequent confession, he had casually walked into the bedroom of this apartment to observe Corll—somewhat startled and irate—ask him, "What are you doing here?" Corll then explained, "I'm just having some fun!" The two sat and talked about the incident, with Corll urging the teenager to remain hushed about the situation. Brooks agreed to this compromise, then left the apartment and hitchhiked back to his father's home. He remained silent as to what he had seen.

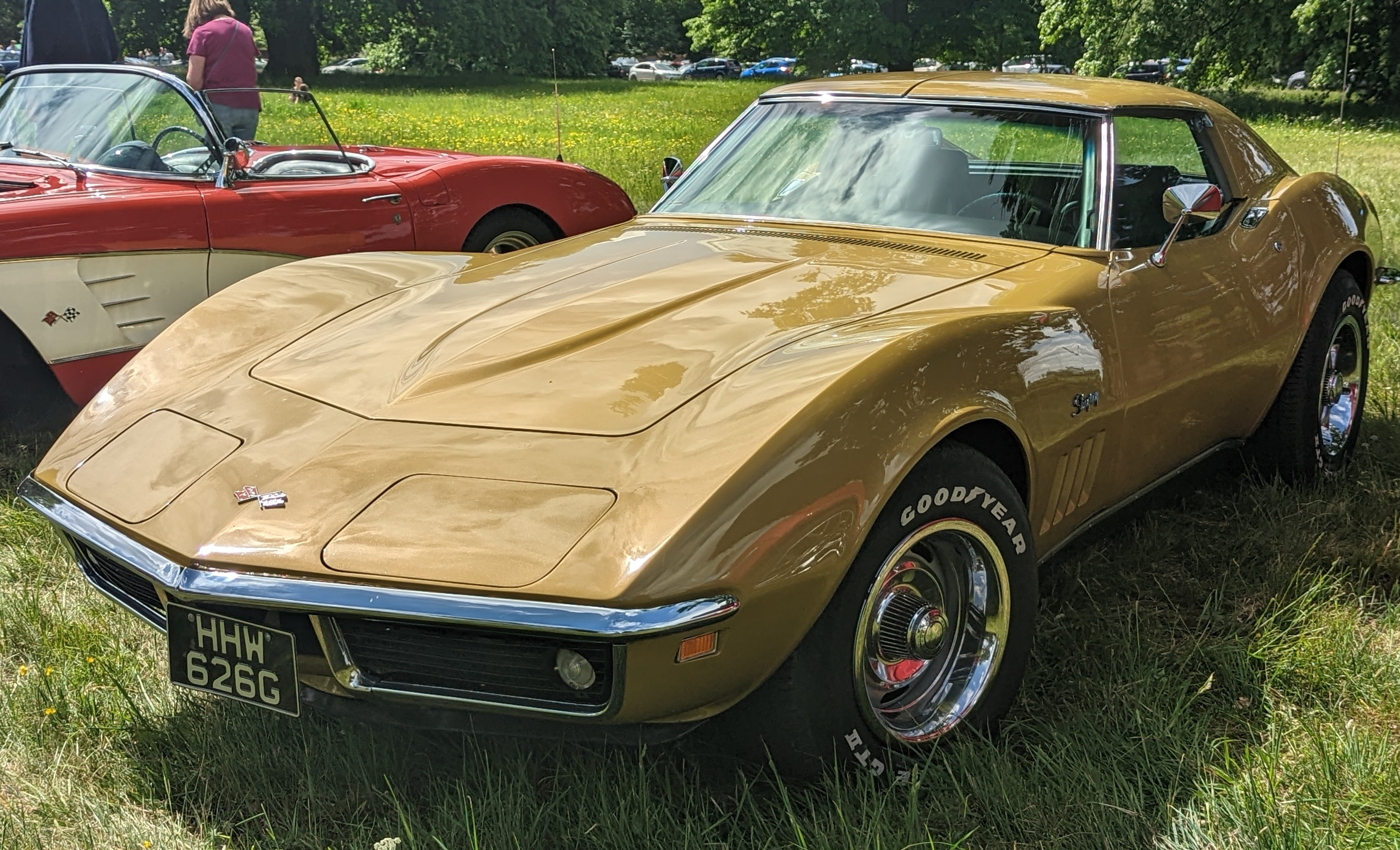
A 1969 Chevrolet Corvette. Brooks accepted a vehicle of this model in return for his silence as to discovering Corll assaulting and murdering two boys at his Yorktown address.

Shortly thereafter, Corll claimed to Brooks that he had been paid to send the two boys he had seen strapped to his bed to California to pose for pornographic photographs to be published in gay pornography. He had promised Brooks a car in return for his silence in their initial conversation at his apartment; Brooks had accepted this offer and Corll would buy him a green 1969 Chevrolet Corvette as a sixteenth birthday present in February 1971. To any individual who questioned as to how he had paid for the vehicle, Brooks would claim he had paid for the car with money he had scrupulously saved, making comments to the effect of "I just scratched pennies for years."

== Murders ==
=== 1970: 3300 Yorktown ===
In either November or early December 1970, Brooks was informed by Corll that the two teenagers he had seen strapped to his bed had actually been murdered. He was offered $200 (the equivalent of approximately $1,670 as of 2026) for any boy he could lure to Corll's apartment, with Corll also emphasizing he should particularly target individuals who likely would not be missed by their families. Brooks accepted this enticement in approximately December 1970. (Note: Corll is known to have committed one murder, and likely two, prior to residing at 3300 Yorktown.)

==== Glass and Yates ====
On the evening of December 13, 1970, Brooks lured two 14-year-old Spring Branch youths named James Eugene Glass and Danny Michael Yates away from a religious rally held at the Evangelistic Temple in Houston Heights to Corll's Yorktown apartment. The two had been driven to this location by Glass's father and brother, and had agreed to meet them after the service. Glass and Yates were last seen by Glass's older brother, Willie, "midway through the service" walking down an aisle toward the exit of the church. It is unknown what ruse Brooks used—with or without the assistance of Corll—to lure the two to Corll's apartment; however, Glass had been an acquaintance of both Corll and Brooks and had taken a great liking to Corll. (Note: Two days prior to the disappearance of Glass and Yates, Corll is believed to have encountered the two—plus Yates's older brother Bradley—close to the Thunderbird Twin Drive-In theater. He is believed to have purchased alcohol for the trio on this occasion before giving Danny Yates his phone number.) Both teens were restrained to Corll's four-poster bed with rope and handcuffs and subsequently raped, strangled, and buried in a Southwest Houston boat shed Corll had begun renting on November 17. An electrical cord with alligator clips attached to each end was buried alongside Yates's body.

=== 1971: Place One Apartments ===
On the afternoon of January 30, 1971, Brooks and Corll encountered two teenage brothers, Donald and Jerry Waldrop, walking toward their parents' home. The Waldrop brothers had been driven to a friend's home on West 12th Street by their father, Everett, with plans to discuss forming a bowling league, and had begun walking home after learning their friend was not at home. The brothers were enticed into Corll's van and driven to an apartment Corll had recently rented on Mangum Road, where they were raped, then strangled to death in Brooks's presence on the day after their abduction before Brooks assisted Corll in their burial in the boat shed.

Five weeks later, on the afternoon of March 9, 15-year-old Randell Lee Harvey was last seen by his family cycling towards Oak Forest, where he worked part-time as a gas station attendant. Harvey was driven to Corll's Mangum Road apartment, where he was subsequently killed by a single gunshot through the eye. He had known Brooks for some time prior to his murder, and Brooks is known to have once reported Harvey to the police, accusing the teenager of stealing his stereo.

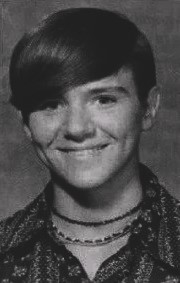
James Eugene Glass

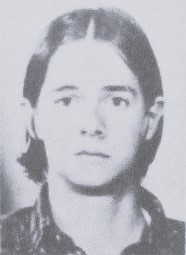
Ruben Willfard Watson Haney

==== Subsequent abductions ====
Between May and August 1971, Corll committed the abduction and murder of at least four further victims—three of whom lived in Houston Heights. He was assisted by Brooks in the abduction and burial of at least three of these victims. Two of these victims, 13-year-old David William Hilligiest and 16-year-old Gregory Malley Winkle, were abducted and killed together on the afternoon of May 29; both were murdered at an apartment Corll by this time rented on West 11th Street. A 17-year-old named Donald John Falcon disappeared from the streets near his parents' West University Place apartment complex on July 1. He is believed to have been murdered at an apartment Corll had rented on East 7th Street on June 1 and on August 17, Corll and Brooks persuaded a 17-year-old acquaintance of theirs named Ruben Willfard Watson Haney—whom they encountered as Haney walked home from a Houston movie theater—to attend a party at an apartment Corll had moved to on San Felipe Street the previous month. Haney agreed and later phoned his mother to inform her he was spending the evening with Brooks. He was subsequently gagged, raped, then strangled to death. All four victims were buried in the boat shed.

One further victim is known to have been murdered in 1971, although this victim remains unidentified. This individual was abducted in approximately October 1971 and murdered at an apartment Corll had moved to on Columbia Street. According to Brooks's confession, this victim was murdered "just before Wayne Henley came into the picture. Dean kept this boy around the house for about four days before he killed him ... I don't remember his name, but we picked him up on 11th and Rutland. It really upset Dean to have to kill this boy because he really liked him."

=== Encounter with Elmer Wayne Henley ===
Throughout much of 1971, Brooks remained enrolled at high school, although his attendance was increasingly sporadic. In approximately October 1971, he encountered Elmer Wayne Henley—then aged fifteen—as the two simultaneously opted to truant from school. Henley would later recall Brooks fell into stride alongside him and asked if he was "skipping school too" as he walked away from the school entrance in the direction of a nearby pool hall and that when he replied in the affirmative, Brooks offered to keep him company for the day, adding he also attended Hamilton Junior High School and that the pool hall was also his intended destination. The two began to truant together regularly, and Brooks soon learned that although Henley was a sociable youth, he came from a broken home, had little money, and worked two simultaneous, menial part-time jobs to assist his mother with household finances. Henley himself soon became curious as to why Brooks always seemed to have ample cash despite not working and himself hailing from a family of modest means. (Note: Henley had been a lifelong friend and neighbor of victim David Hilligiest. He had actively participated in the search for Hilligiest and Gregory Winkle; these efforts had included distributing flyers offering a $1,000 reward for information leading to the teenagers' whereabouts and attempting to reassure Hilligiest's parents there may be an innocent explanation for the teenagers' prolonged absence.)

Brooks later introduced Henley to Corll, and the two began making a point of meeting the 15-year-old at the gas station where he worked part-time to exchange pleasantries and small talk. Henley later stated that though he admired Corll because he worked hard and seemed to have his life in order, he also suspected that Corll was homosexual, and initially concluded that Brooks was "hustling himself a queer." Weeks later, Brooks informed Henley that if he discreetly left his Heights home "without telling anyone where [he was] going", he and Corll would pick him up behind the Fulbright Methodist Church at 5 p.m. sharp and discuss "a deal where [he] could make some money." Henley agreed, and Brooks and Corll picked him up at the agreed time and drove him to Corll's address—likely as an intended victim.

This evident ploy to make Henley Corll's next victim was thwarted when Henley became unnerved at observing Corll brandishing a hunting knife as he discussed the need to silence anyone who caught him in the act of future burglaries he had proposed Henley commit with him before Brooks asked: "You didn't tell anyone where you were, right?" This question led Henley to reply that he had informed his mother and grandmother he was leaving the family home in Brooks's company to meet Corll for the first time. Minutes later, Brooks drove Henley home.

==== Second accomplice ====
Despite this initial setback, Corll evidently decided Henley—a much more sociable youth than Brooks—would make a good accomplice, and Henley soon began spending increasing amounts of time in Corll's company. Initially, Corll continued the ruse he had spun to Henley in their initial meeting that he was involved in organized theft, and he would burglarize several local addresses with Brooks and Henley, for which Henley was paid small sums of money. Shortly thereafter, as Corll and Henley sat in a vehicle at the corner of Eleventh and Heights Boulevard, Corll remarked to the teenager: "You know, it's too bad there's not a market in people, they're everywhere."

Over the course of several subsequent conversations, Corll repeatedly referred to the topic of human trafficking before informing Henley "such a market does exist" and claiming that he was involved in a "white slavery ring" operating from Dallas, in which teenage boys were sold as houseboys to wealthy middle-aged clients across the country and that he would pay him $200 for any teenage boy he could lure to his apartment. Corll referred to this organization as "the Syndicate".

=== 1972: Schuler Street ===
In either February or early March 1972, Henley decided he would "help find a boy" for Corll to sell to the Syndicate as his family was in dire financial circumstances. According to Henley's subsequent confession, he resolved to participate in a sole abduction as he could use the money "to get better things for my [family], so one day I went over to Dean's place on Schuler Street and told him I would get a boy for him." The pair then drove around the Heights to search for a victim. At the corner of 11th and Studewood, Henley persuaded an unknown youth with dark hair to enter Corll's Plymouth GTX on the promise of smoking some marijuana at Corll's apartment.

At Corll's home, Henley enacted a previous ruse he and Corll had privately devised in which Henley would cuff own his hands behind his back, then release himself with a key discreetly hidden in his jeans pocket, then con the victim into placing the handcuffs upon himself. After duping the teenager into donning the handcuffs, Henley watched Corll pounce on the youth, bind his hands and feet with parachute cord, then place adhesive tape over his mouth. Brooks then drove Henley home, explaining to him the Syndicate did not yet know of his participation and thus he should not be present when they arrived to collect the captive. The next day, Corll paid Henley the agreed sum of $200, informing him the teenager had been sold into the sex slavery ring.

Approximately month later, on the evening of March 24, Henley, Corll and Brooks encountered an 18-year-old acquaintance of Henley's named Frank Anthony Aguirre leaving a seafood restaurant on Yale Street. Henley invited Aguirre to accompany him to Corll's home on the promise of drinking beer and smoking marijuana; Aguirre agreed and followed the trio to Corll's home in his Rambler. Inside Corll's house, Aguirre smoked marijuana with the trio before picking up a pair of handcuffs Corll had deliberately left on his table. In response, Corll pounced on Aguirre, pushed him onto the table, cuffed his hands behind his back, then dragged him into his bedroom. (Note: In 2022, Henley would recollect of the precise moment Corll pounced upon and overpowered Aguirre: "Dean jumped him ... I didn't know what to do.")

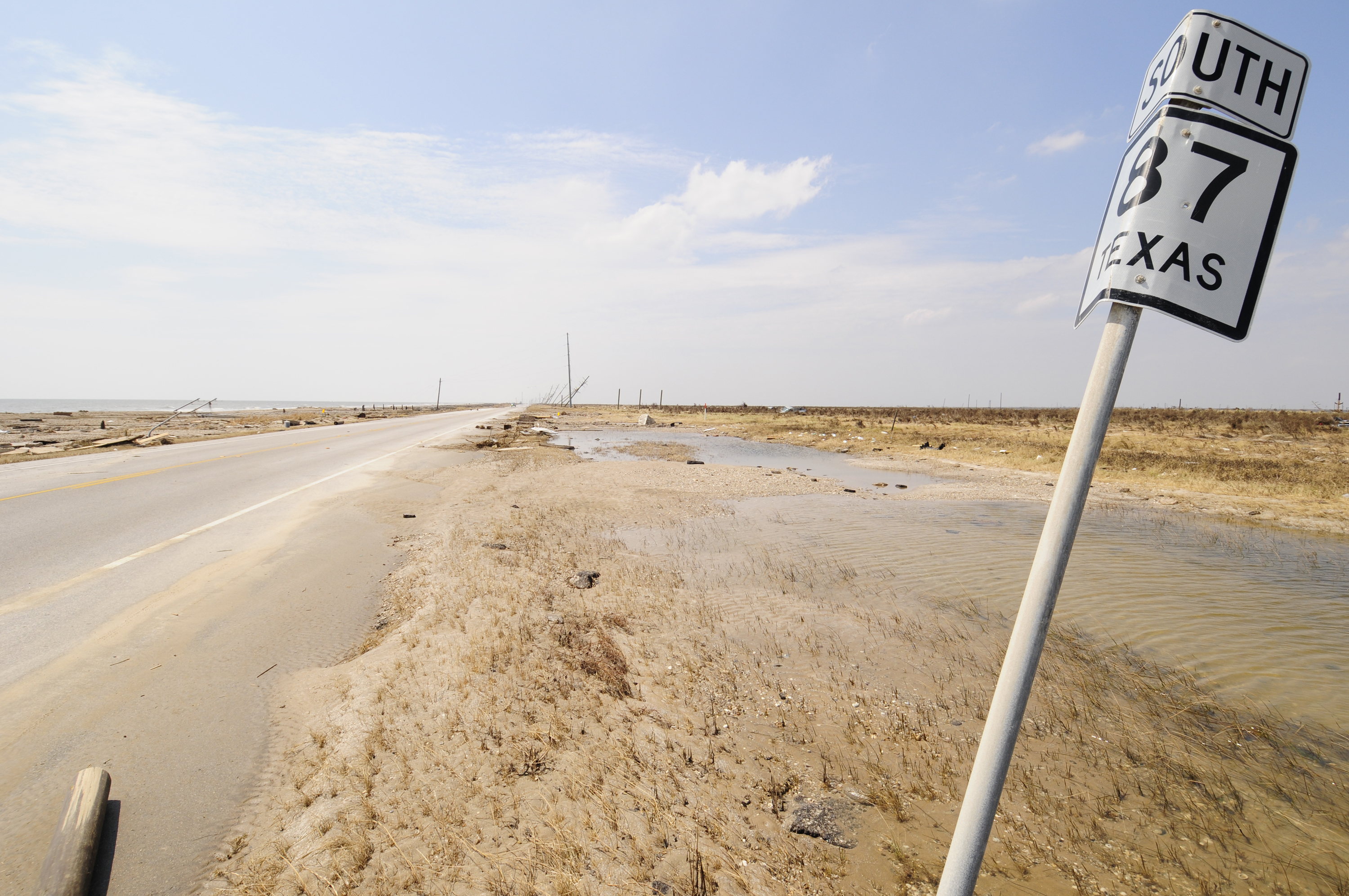
High Island Beach. At least five victims murdered in 1972 were buried at this location.

Henley—at this stage still oblivious to the true fate of the first victim he had lured to Corll's home—attempted to dissuade Corll from raping and killing Aguirre. However, Corll refused, informing Henley that he had raped, tortured, and killed the previous victim he had assisted in abducting, and that Aguirre was to suffer the same fate. Brooks then drove Henley home. The following evening, Henley assisted Corll and Brooks in burying Aguirre's body at High Island Beach.

Despite learning the reality of the fate of the boys he or Brooks brought to Corll, Henley continued to assist in the abductions and murders. Brooks would later claim that "most of the killings that occurred after [Henley] came into the picture involved all three of us. I still did not take part in the actual killing, but nearly always all three of us were there." According to Brooks, although "it didn't bother [him] to see" the victims restrained, tortured, raped and murdered, both prior to and following Henley's participation in the abductions and murders, his own role had primarily been to participate in the abduction and burial of the victims and "help if something went wrong", but that Henley had increasingly participated in the abuse and torture of the victims—being "especially sadistic" at Schuler Street.

Less than one month later, Henley lured 17-year-old Mark Steven Scott to Corll's apartment. Scott—well known to Brooks, Henley and Corll—was specifically chosen by Corll to be his next victim as he had "recently cheated [Corll] on a deal" pertaining to stolen goods. As such, by April 1972, Corll held extreme animosity toward him and on April 20, Corll instructed Henley to lure Scott to his apartment, where he and Brooks were waiting. Henley encountered Scott walking down an alleyway in the Heights and persuaded him to accompany him to Corll's apartment.

According to Henley, shortly prior to Scott's abduction, either he or Corll had accidentally burned himself on an incense cone, and this incident had inspired Corll to torture Scott via this method. Scott was grabbed by force and fought furiously against attempts by Corll and Brooks to restrain him, even attempting to stab Corll with a knife the following morning after several hours of abuse and torture; however, according to Brooks, Scott "just gave up" after seeing Henley point a .22 caliber pistol toward him. Brooks would later confess to authorities that "Wayne killed Mark Scott and I think that he strangled him."

Once they went on the board, they were as good as dead ... it was all over but the shouting and the crying.

— David Brooks, referencing the fate of the victims subsequent to their restraining to Corll's "torture board". August 10, 1973

Brooks would later inform authorities that Corll typically observed rules in how to overpower and restrain his victims—one of which, by 1972, was that there should invariably be at least one more individual to overpower and restrain the victim(s) than the total number of victims. Less than two weeks after Henley's sixteenth birthday, on May 21, either Corll or Brooks summoned him to Corll's apartment, where he observed two Heights teenagers, Billy Gene Baulch Jr. (17) and Johnny Ray Delome (16), socializing with Corll and Brooks. He assisted Corll and Brooks in overpowering and subduing the teenagers, both of whom were bound, then tied to Corll's bed. Both were forced to write letters to their parents claiming they had found employment "for a trucker loading and unloading from Houston to Washington" before Corll proceeded to rape them prior to their torture.

In Brooks's confession, he stated that both youths were tied to Corll's bed and, after their torture and rape, Henley strangled Baulch to death with a length of cord, with the process lasting almost thirty minutes as Brooks tried to divert Delome's attention by talking to him. Henley then shouted, "Hey, Johnny!" and shot Delome once in the forehead with Corll's .22 caliber pistol, with the bullet exiting through the youth's ear. Several minutes later, Delome pleaded with Henley, "Wayne, please don't!" before he was strangled to death by both Corll and Henley. Both youths were later buried at High Island Beach.

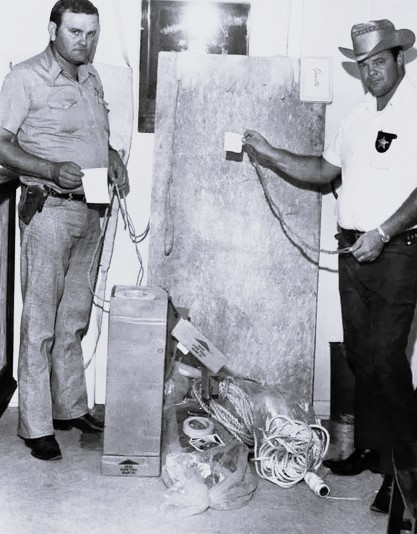
One of the plywood torture boards constructed by Corll

==== Westcott Towers ====
Between June 26 and November 16, 1972, Corll resided in two separate apartments at Westcott Towers. At least five further victims were murdered between these dates. The first victim, 17-year-old Steven Kent Sickman, was last seen leaving a party held near the Heights on July 19. He was murdered by strangulation with a nylon cord and buried close to the entrance of the boat shed; his murder was followed approximately one month later by that of 19-year-old Roy Eugene Bunton, who was last seen by his family walking to his job as an assistant manager at a shoe store within the Northwest Mall. Bunton was bound, gagged with a section of Turkish towel and adhesive tape, then killed by two gunshots to the head before also being buried close to the entrance of the boat shed. It is unknown whether Brooks or Henley assisted with either abduction or murder.

On the afternoon of October 3, Henley and Brooks abducted two Heights boys named Wally Jay Simoneaux (14) and Richard Edward Hembree (13) as they walked home from Hamilton Junior High School. The two—described by Brooks as "both young boys from the Heights area"—were enticed into Brooks's Corvette and driven to Corll's address. That evening, Simoneaux is known to have phoned his mother, Mildred, and to have shouted the word "Mama" into the receiver before the connection was terminated. Both were restrained to a plywood torture board measuring 8 by 2.5 feet (2.44 by 0.76 m) with handcuffs and ropes affixed to both sides of each corner and with a further hole drilled into the top center of the board in order that the device could be hung upon a wall which Corll had constructed that summer. The following morning, Hembree was accidentally shot in the mouth by Henley. According to Brooks's confession, "Wayne accidentally shot one of them. This was about 7 a.m. I was in the other room asleep when this happened. Dean told me Wayne had just just came in waving the .22 and accidentally shot one of the boys in the jaw." Both were kept alive for approximately twelve further hours before they were strangled to death. Simoneaux and Hembree were later buried in the boat shed.

One month later, on November 11, a 19-year-old carpenter's helper named Richard Alan Kepner was abducted while walking to call his fiancée from a pay phone. His strangled body was later buried at High Island Beach and on an unknown date the same month, an 18-year-old Oak Forest youth known to Corll and Henley named Willard Karmon Branch Jr. disappeared while hitchhiking from Mount Pleasant to Houston. He was emasculated and shot once above the left ear before his body was buried in the boat shed.

== 1973 ==
On January 20, 1973, Corll moved to the Princessa Apartments at 1855 Wirt Road in the Spring Branch district of Houston. Less than two weeks later, on February 3, he killed 17-year-old Joseph Allen Lyles. Lyles had known both Corll and Brooks for several months prior to his disappearance, and had lived upon the same street as Brooks in early 1973. According to Brooks, Corll had wanted him to assist in restraining Lyles, but he had refused; in response, Corll "grabbed", overpowered and bound the teen before Brooks hurriedly left Corll's apartment. Lyles's body was bound, wrapped in plastic and buried in a beach sandbank at Jefferson County.

=== 2020 Lamar Drive ===
On March 19, Corll relocated to his father's residence at 2020 Lamar Drive in Pasadena; he briefly lived with his father, stepmother and half-brother until they vacated the property. Brooks and Henley both later testified to the increase in the level of brutality subjected upon the victims lured to this address; both—but particularly Henley—also sensed Corll was increasingly losing his sense of self-control while simultaneously becoming suspicious of both accomplices. In addition, by early 1973, Brooks had been dating a 15-year-old girl named Bridget Clark for several months and, by March, had impregnated her. The two subsequently became engaged. As such, Brooks had begun spending increasing amounts of time in Bridget's company and by the spring of 1973, Henley had become Corll's primary accomplice in the abduction of the victims, although until early July, Brooks continued to assist in the crimes.

On Monday, June 4, 1973, Corll ordered Henley to "bring [him] a boy". In response, Henley lured a 15-year-old acquaintance named William Ray Lawrence to Corll's home upon the promise of fishing with himself and Corll at Lake Sam Rayburn in San Augustine County. Lawrence last phoned his father to state he and "some friends" were traveling to Lake Sam Rayburn to "go fishing", but that they would return to Houston in "two, three days ... maybe Thursday."

Due to the fact Corll "really liked [Lawrence]", the teenager was kept alive for three days throughout which he was almost continually bound to Corll's bed. Brooks did not participate in Lawrence's actual abduction, although he did arrive at Corll's home to observe the teenager restrained in Corll's bedroom on the evening of his abduction. He was also present when, after three days of abuse and torture, Lawrence was strangled to death with a ligature. Corll and Brooks buried Lawrence's body at Lake Sam Rayburn the following evening as Henley kept a lookout in Corll's Ford Econoline van.

Eleven days after Lawrence's abduction, a 20-year-old married man named Raymond Stanley Blackburn disappeared while hitchhiking from the Heights to Baton Rouge, Louisiana to see his wife and newborn child. Brooks would later confess to entering Corll's home "just after" Corll had strangled Blackburn to death. He also assisted Corll and Henley in Blackburn's subsequent burial at Lake Sam Rayburn.

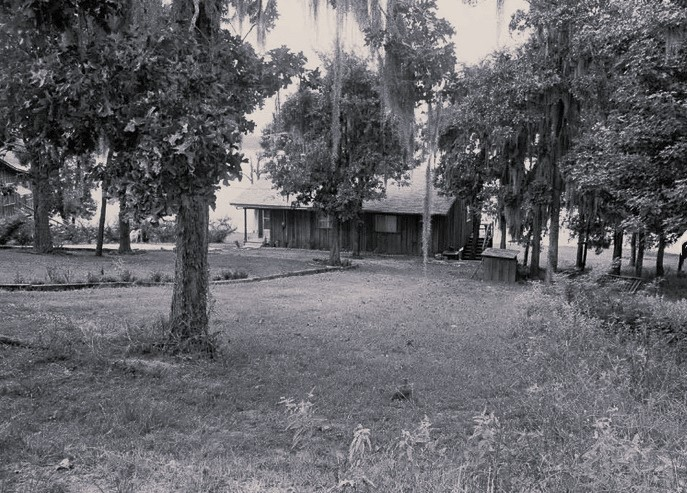
The log cabin owned by Corll's family at Lake Sam Rayburn. Four victims killed by Corll and his accomplices in the summer of 1973 were buried at this location.

Three weeks later, on July 7, a 15-year-old named Homer Louis Garcia telephoned his mother to say he was spending the night with a friend from the driving school in which he had recently enrolled, but whom he refused to name. He was shot in the head and chest and left to bleed to death in Corll's bathtub before his body was buried by the trio at Lake Sam Rayburn. His death was followed five days later by that of 17-year-old U.S. Marine John Manning Sellers, who was shot to death with a rifle and buried at High Island Beach. Sellars's torched vehicle was later discovered in Starks, Louisiana. (Note: Sellers would later be disputed as being a victim of Corll by Harris County Medical Examiner Joseph Jachimczyk. His grave site—located two miles from the other six victims buried at this location—was revealed to police by a truck driver as opposed to Brooks and Henley.)

=== Abstainment from participation ===
On July 13, Brooks married his pregnant fiancée. The two moved into their own apartment on Pech Road, and Henley temporarily became Corll's sole accomplice, assisting Corll in the abduction and murder of three further teenagers between July 19 and July 25. Henley would claim these three abductions were the "only three" that occurred after his becoming an accomplice to Corll in which Brooks was not a participant. One of these three victims, 15-year-old Michael Anthony Baulch—the younger brother of previous victim Billy Gene Baulch Jr.—was abducted on the afternoon of July 19 on his way to get a haircut; he was strangled and buried at Lake Sam Rayburn. The other two victims, Charles Cary Cobble (17) and Marty Ray Jones (18), were abducted together on the afternoon of July 25. The two were last seen walking along 27th Street in the company of Henley. Two days after their abduction, Jones was strangled to death with a Venetian blind cord as Cobble—observing the murder of his best friend—went into cardiac arrest; Henley partially resuscitated Cobble before Corll ordered him to stop and simply shoot Cobble to death. Henley buried the youths in the center of Corll's boat shed, with Corll briefly locking him inside the shed while he retrieved bags of lime to spread over their bodies.

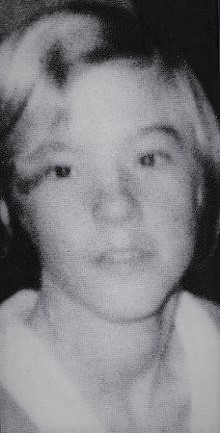
James Stanton Dreymala

=== Final murder ===
On August 3, Corll committed his final murder. This murder was committed with the knowledge and abetting of Brooks, but not Henley, who spent this particular weekend vacationing in Mount Pleasant with several friends. The victim was a 13-year-old boy from South Houston named James Stanton Dreymala, whom Corll encountered riding his homemade bicycle close to his parents' home and who he lured to his home upon the promise of collecting empty glass bottles from his shed to collect the deposit for their return. Brooks observed Dreymala at Corll's home prior to his restrainment and murder; he would share a pizza with the teenager before leaving him alone with Corll after approximately forty-five minutes, later adding Dreymala had seemingly enjoyed his company. Dreymala was tied to Corll's torture board, then raped and tortured before being strangled with a cord prior to his burial close to the entrance of the boat shed.

== August 8, 1973 ==
On the morning of August 8, 1973, Henley shot Corll to death in an act of self-defense before contacting authorities and gradually confessing to both his own and Brooks's assistance in the abductions and murders. Brooks was not present at the time of Corll's shooting.

Henley had invited a 20-year-old friend of his named Timothy Cordell Kerley to attend a party at Corll's Pasadena residence on the evening of August 7. Kerley had recently become casually acquainted with Corll, who had specifically instructed Henley to bring the youth to his home in order that he became his next victim. The two had left Corll's home in the early hours of the following morning, only to return accompanied by 15-year-old Rhonda Louise Williams. The presence of a female in Corll's home—thwarting his plans to overpower and restrain Kerley—infuriated Corll, who privately informed Henley he had "ruined everything". However, Corll then seemingly calmed down and offered the trio beer and marijuana. The three began drinking and smoking, with Henley and Kerley also sniffing paint fumes from a paper bag as Corll watched them intently before apparently retiring to bed. By approximately 5:30 a.m., Henley, Kerley and Williams had each passed out.

Corll then bound and gagged the unconscious trio, also stripping Kerley naked. Noting Henley had woken, he removed the gag from his mouth and informed him, "Man, you blew it bringing that girl" before shouting: "I'm gonna kill you all! But first I'm gonna have my fun!" as Henley protested against Corll's actions and attempted to reason with him. Corll then repeatedly kicked Williams in the chest, shouting, "Wake up, bitch!"

As all three began to recover their senses and struggle against their bindings, Henley was dragged to the kitchen, where Corll placed a pistol against his stomach, threatening to shoot him. Henley successfully persuaded Corll to release him after promising to rape and murder Williams as Corll did likewise to Kerley. Williams and Kerley were then separately carried into Corll's bedroom, where a transistor radio rigged to a pair of dry cells was placed between the two. The volume was turned to maximum to drown any shouting and screaming. Shortly thereafter, Williams lifted her head and asked Henley, "Is this for real?" to which Henley answered, "Yes." In response, Williams asked: "Are you going to do anything about it?"

Minutes later, Henley shot Corll to death with his own .22 caliber pistol after grabbing the gun from a bedside table, pointing the weapon at Corll and shouting: "You've gone far enough, Dean! I can't go on any longer ... I can't have you kill all my friends!" He then contacted authorities, initially confessing to shooting Corll in self-defense, with his accounts of the events which had unfolded prior to the shooting corroborated by Kerley and Williams; however, when questioned as to the apparatus found in the room where the three had been bound, assaulted and threatened, Henley explained that Corll "liked little boys" before gradually divulging his knowledge of and participation in several abductions and murders and providing the names of three missing Heights teenagers. He agreed to accompany police to Corll's boat shed in Southwest Houston, where he claimed the bodies of several victims—including the three he had named—could be found.

=== Voluntary statements ===
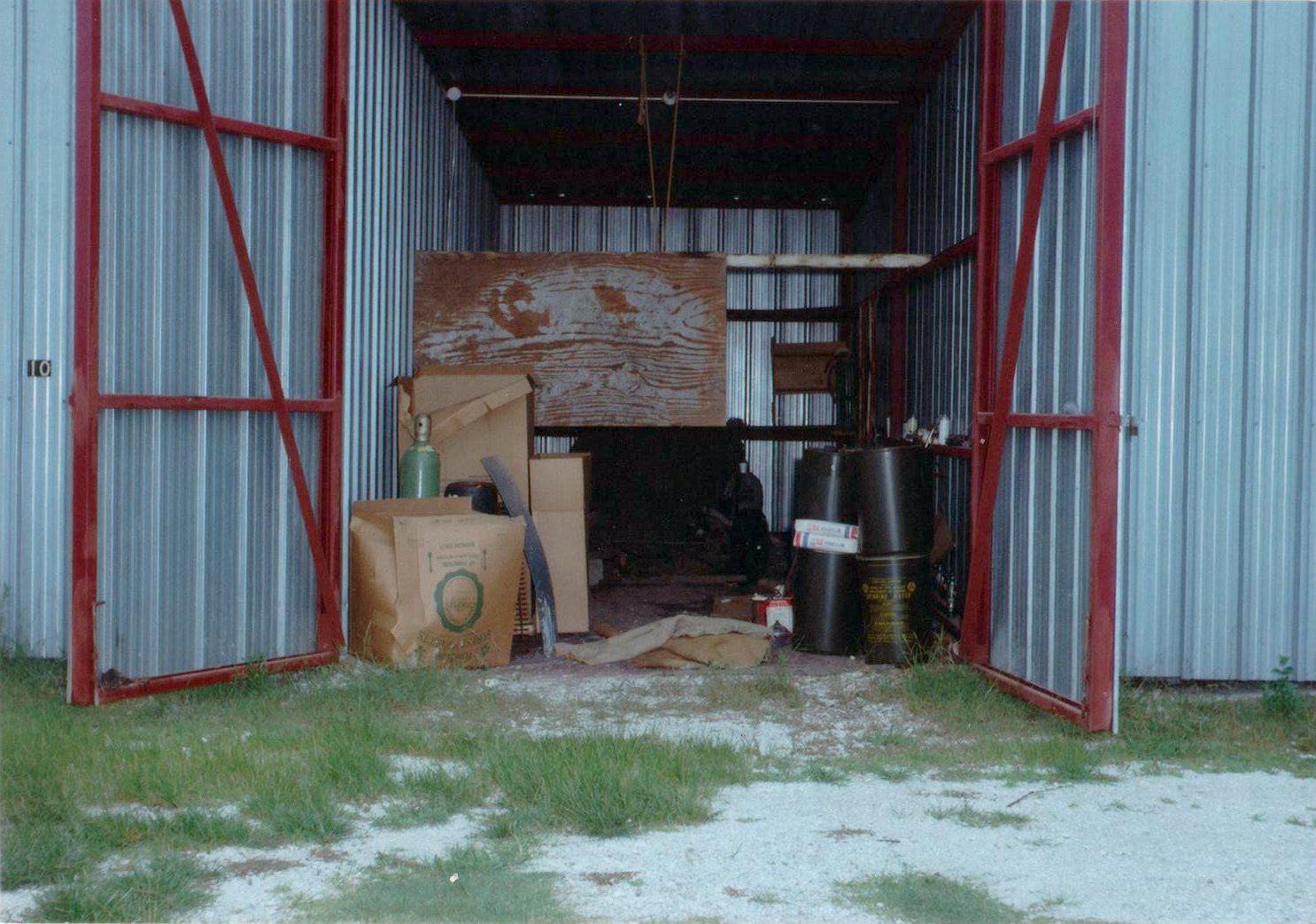
Corll's rented boat shed in Southwest Houston, pictured on August 8, 1973, immediately prior to the search for victims

Accompanied by his father, Brooks presented himself at the Houston Police Department (HPD) headquarters on the evening of August 8 after hearing news reports of Corll's fatal shooting and the unearthing of bodies at his boat stall. He provided a verbal statement in which he admitted to having known Corll since 1967 and having frequently resided with him over the last several years. Brooks admitted he had known Corll was homosexual, adding that, beginning in 1969, he had frequently allowed Corll to perform oral sex upon him for money. He further confessed to having introduced Henley to Corll.

In reference to the ongoing discovery of bodies, Brooks initially denied any knowledge of or participation in the murders, but soon admitted to having known that Corll had raped and killed two teenagers while he resided in the Yorktown apartments in 1970, explaining: "Later on he admitted he killed them, and he bought me a Corvette." He then speculated that two missing Heights teenagers—Ruben Haney and Mark Scott—whom he had seen in Corll's company shortly before their disappearances, may have also been murdered.

In the early afternoon of August 9, Brooks provided a three-page written witness statement in which he divulged that, shortly before Corll had moved to his Mangum Road apartment in mid-January 1971, he had been informed by Corll that he had murdered several teenage boys, and had repeated these remarks on several occasions, leading him to form the impression that Corll had murdered up to thirty teenagers over a span of approximately three years. One of these occasions in which Corll had confessed to having murdered teenage boys had been while he and Corll were at his boat shed, and on another occasion, Corll had remarked "how hard it was [to] strangle someone and that the way they did it on TV wasn't realistic, because it took quite a while to do it". Corll had also mentioned his knowledge of an organization in Dallas engaged in similar activity to his.

=== Full confession ===
Brooks provided a three-page full confession on the morning of August 10 in which he admitting participating in several abductions, being present at several killings and assisting in several burials, although he continued to deny any direct participation in the actual murders, claiming his participation had been limited to being "in the room when [the murders occurred] and [I] was supposed to help if something went wrong". (Note: Henley would later claim Brooks had once confided in him he had killed one victim himself.) According to Brooks, Henley's role had initially been the same as his, but Henley soon actively participated in the torture and murder of many of the victims killed from early 1972 onward and that he "seemed to enjoy causing pain", being particularly sadistic in the murders committed while Corll had resided at Schuler Street. Brooks was able to name several victims, but only descriptions of others killed at various addresses.

When questioned about the plywood torture board found at Corll's home, Brooks stated many victims had been restrained to this device, particularly if Corll intended to keep them alive for extended periods of time, adding: "Once they went on the board, they were as good as dead ... it was all over but the shouting and the crying." Brooks's confession estimated Corll had killed between twenty-five and thirty boys, most of whom had been buried in the boat shed, with approximately four buried at Lake Sam Rayburn, and an estimated "five or more" victims to be located at High Island Beach. He agreed to assist investigators in locating the victims buried at the beach. (Note: At the time of Brooks's full confession, investigators had concluded the search for victims buried in the boat shed, and Henley was in the process of leading investigators to the locations of the victims buried at Lake Sam Rayburn.)

== Search for victims ==
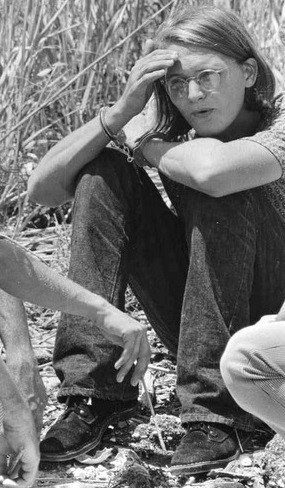
Brooks, pictured assisting in the recovery of the victims buried at High Island Beach on August 10, 1973

On the afternoon of August 10, both Brooks and Henley accompanied police to High Island Beach; each led investigators to a single shallow grave less than 3 feet (1 m) deep in locations approximately 257 feet (78 m) apart before the search for further victims was postponed until the following Monday.

=== Further confession ===
In efforts to file specific murder charges against Brooks, he was questioned in greater detail with regard to the murder of a victim specifically named by Henley the previous day and whom investigators believed they had recovered the body of: William Ray Lawrence. Brooks was first shown a photograph of this teenager and asked if he recognized him, to which he replied: "Yeah, he's one of the kids that was killed. I don't know his name, but I remember the whole thing." He then provided a two-page statement—completed at 10:30 p.m. on August 10—in which he described arriving at Corll's Pasadena home to observe Lawrence "tied to the bed" before he simply "went to bed in the opposite bedroom" after driving Henley home. Brooks also described how Lawrence had been murdered after approximately three days of abuse and torture and that he, Corll and Henley had then transported the teenager's body to Lake Sam Rayburn with the intention of burying this victim at this location. Brooks further confessed that prior to Corll and him burying the body "by a trench near a dirt road", he and Henley had fished at the lake for over three hours.

Brooks and Henley again accompanied investigators to High Island Beach on August 13. Four further victims would be located at this location—making a total of 27 victims—before the search for any further victims was terminated, despite Henley having insisted to investigators that two further victims had been buried on the beach in 1972 and the fact that two extra bones (an arm bone and a pelvis) were discovered buried with the final pair of victims recovered. (Note: In 2011, one of the homicide detectives assigned to assist in the recovery of the victims, Larry Earls, would reflect on the decision to terminate the search for further victims on August 13: "It always bothered me. Henley and Brooks told us that they thought there were more bodies, and there were other places where we wanted to dig, but we were told no.")

At the time of the discovery of the murders, the tally of 27 known victims attributed to the Houston Mass Murders made the case the worst of serial murder, in terms of the number of victims, in the United States.

== Indictment ==
On August 13, a grand jury convened in Harris County to hear evidence against Henley and Brooks. Henley would ultimately be indicted for six murders, and Brooks for four. Both would reject pretrial offers presented to them by Assistant District Attorney Don Lambright of life sentences in exchange for pleas of guilty to the murders.

== Trial ==
Although Brooks had been indicted on four counts of murder, he was brought to trial solely for the June 1973 murder of 15-year-old William Ray Lawrence. He was tried before Judge William Hatten in Houston on February 27, 1975, and chose to plead not guilty. Brooks was defended by Jim Skelton and Elaine Brady, with Assistant District Attorney Tommy Dunn and Donald Lambright prosecuting the case.

On February 28, the state introduced into evidence each of Brooks's three separate statements—as opposed to solely his final statement specifically referring to Lawrence's murder—and thus detailing his knowledge of and participation in many of the other twenty-six known murders. These were read aloud to the courtroom by a police officer after Judge Hatten overruled objections from Brooks's attorneys that they be introduced into evidence.

Brooks's defense attorneys argued that their client had not committed any murders, and attempted to portray Corll and, to a lesser degree, Henley as being the active participants in the actual killings. Assistant District Attorney Tommy Dunn dismissed the defense's contention outright, at one point telling the jury: "Was he an innocent bystander? This defendant was in on this killing, this murderous rampage, from the very beginning. He tells you he was a cheerleader if nothing else. That's what he was telling you about his presence. You know he was in on it."

In the state's closing argument, prosecutor Donald Lambright outlined the ordeal endured by Lawrence over the period of three days, stating: "What kind of hell do you think he went through for three days?" He then described the teenager's ultimate death as "a blessing" in that his murder put an end to Lawrence's suffering. Lambright further referenced Brooks having confessed in each of his statements to seeing numerous boys tied to varying restraining devices where "they were homosexually raped for God knows how long" before their murder, with Brooks assisting in their burials.

In a 40-minute closing argument, defense attorney Jim Skelton passionately argued before the jury that the state had based their case entirely upon circumstantial evidence. Skelton emphasized that nobody disputed the brutality of Lawrence's murder, but that the state had only proven Brooks to be an accessory to Lawrence's murder, and had not proven murder itself, stating: "The state has proven David Owen Brooks of being an accessory to murder; the state has not established a murder case. They have proved accessory to murder—not murder ... before you convict, you've got to find an act to punish."

=== Conviction ===
Brooks's trial lasted less than one week, although the jury deliberated for just 90 minutes before announcing they had reached a verdict on March 4: Brooks was found guilty of murder with malice. He showed no emotion as the verdict was announced, although his wife, Bridget, burst into tears and had to be escorted from the courtroom as his father covered his eyes with his hands. The following day, both counsels argued as to the sentence to be imposed, with prosecutor Tommy Dunn arguing "the facts of the case cry out for maximum punishment" before defense attorney Jim Skelton urged the jury to display fairness and impartiality in their deliberations. After 62 minutes, the jury recommended Brooks be sentenced to life imprisonment.

An appeal against Brooks's conviction was lodged. This appeal contended that the evidence presented against him at trial was insufficient to support his conviction; that extraneous criminal offenses were unlawfully admitted in evidence; and that the signed confessions used against him were taken without his being informed of his legal rights. His appeal was dismissed in May 1979.

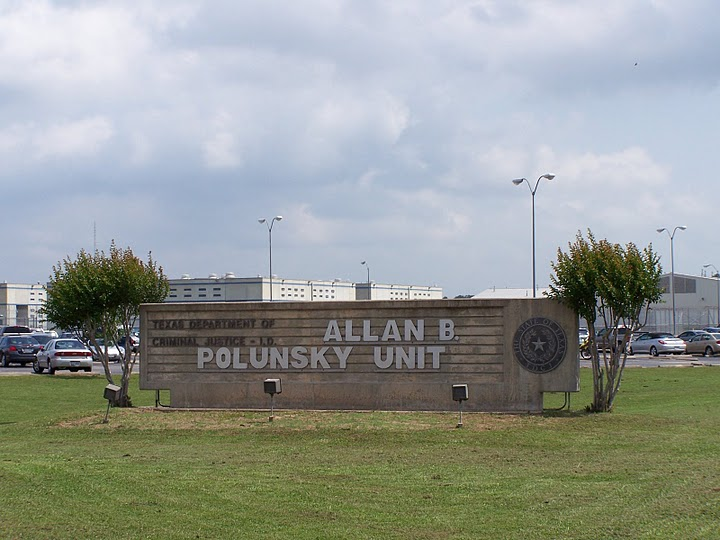
The Allan B. Polunsky Unit. Brooks had served forty-five years of a life sentence and was incarcerated in this facility at the time of his death.

== Death ==
David Brooks died of COVID-19 related complications in a Galveston hospital on May 28, 2020, at the age of 65, having been admitted to this hospital on May 12 with respiratory symptoms consistent with COVID-19. Brooks suffered from other ailments, but his death was due to COVID-19.

At the time of his death, Brooks was incarcerated at the Allan B. Polunsky Unit in Polk County, Texas. He had served forty-five years of a life sentence. He is buried at Captain Joe Byrd Cemetery in Walker County.

== Aftermath ==
Brooks and Henley would correspond on only one occasion in the decades following their respective convictions and prior to his death; in this sole instance, he responded to a letter from Henley inviting continued correspondence. Neither maintained written contact, with Henley musing in 2011: "I wrote him a letter once, asking how he was doing. He wrote back—he typed his letter and didn't sign it—saying 'Let's stay in touch', but we never did. I mean, in the end, what were we going to say to each other? How we wished we had never met Dean?"

In the decades following his conviction, Brooks typically shunned media interviews, although he did assist in efforts by forensic anthropologist Sharon Derrick to identify the remaining unidentified victims of the Houston Mass Murders in the 2000s. His compliance would assist in the October 2008 identification of victim Randell Lee Harvey.

Brooks's wife, Bridget, divorced him in 1977; his daughter, Rachel Lynn (b. December 16, 1973) frequently visited her father in prison, although she would die of injuries sustained in a car accident on October 19, 1992, at the age of eighteen. The car accident occurred on the evening of her high school prom.

== Media ==
=== Film ===
- A film loosely inspired by the Houston Mass Murders, Freak Out, was released in 2003. The film was directed by Brad Jones, who also starred as Corll. This film largely focuses upon the last night of Corll's life, prior to Henley shooting him and contacting authorities.
- Production of a film directly based upon the Houston Mass Murders, In a Madman's World, concluded in 2014. Directed by Josh Vargas, In a Madman's World is directly based upon Elmer Wayne Henley's life before, during, and immediately after his involvement with Dean Corll and David Brooks. Limited edition copies of the film were released in 2017. Brooks is played by Bobby Haworth.

=== Bibliography ===
- Gibson, Barbara (2023). Houston Mass Murders 1973: A True Crime Narrative. Independent. ISBN 979-8-882-66863-0.
- Gurwell, John K. (1974). Mass Murder in Houston. Cordovan Press.
- Hanna, David (1975). Harvest of Horror: Mass Murder in Houston. Belmont Tower.
- Jessel, David; Wilson, Colin (1991). "The Candy Man". Murder Casebook: Investigations into the Ultimate Crime. No. 102. Marshall Cavendish. ISBN 978-0-748-53511-8.
- Johns, Bill (2025). The Candy Man - Dean Corll and the Houston Mass Murders: A True Crime Investigation of America's Most Overlooked Serial Killer. Independent. ISBN 979-8-268-69909-8.
- Olsen, Jack (1974). The Man with the Candy: The Story of the Houston Mass Murders. Simon & Schuster. ISBN 0-671-21821-2.
- Olsen, Lise (2025). The Scientist and the Serial Killer: The Search for Houston's Lost Boys. Random House Publishing Group. ISBN 978-0-593-59568-8.
- Ramsland, Katherine; Ullman, Tracy (2024). The Serial Killer's Apprentice: The True Story of How Houston's Deadliest Murderer Turned a Kid Into a Killing Machine. Penzler Publishers. ISBN 978-1-613-16495-2.
- Williams, Paul (1994). "The Pied Piper". Real-Life Crimes. No. 130. Eaglemoss Publications Ltd. ISBN 978-1-858-75022-4.

=== Television ===
- A 1982 documentary, The Killing of America, features a section devoted to the Houston Mass Murders.
- FactualTV host a documentary focusing upon the murders committed by Corll and his accomplices. Forensic Anthropologist Dr. Sharon Derrick is among those interviewed for the documentary.
- Investigation Discovery has broadcast a documentary focusing upon the Houston Mass Murders within their documentary series, Most Evil. This documentary, titled Manipulators, features an interview with Henley conducted by a former forensic psychologist named Kris Mohandie.
- The crime thriller series Mindhunter has broadcast an episode mentioning the Houston Mass Murders. This episode was first broadcast on August 16, 2019.
- Houston-based news channel KPRC-TV has broadcast an episode focusing upon the Houston Mass Murders as part of their crime series The Evidence Room. Hosted by investigative reporter Robert Arnold, this 28-minute episode, titled The Candy Man's Henchmen, was first broadcast in February 2023.
- The Serial Killer's Apprentice. Commissioned by Investigation Discovery, this two-hour documentary was first broadcast on August 17, 2025, and contains audio recordings of Henley's interviews with forensic psychologist Katherine Ramsland.

=== Podcast ===
- The Clown and the Candyman (2020–2021). An eight-part podcast series narrated by Jacqueline Bynon, investigating the murders committed by Corll, Henley and Brooks in addition to serial killer John Wayne Gacy. This series explores their respective potential links to a nationwide sex trafficking network, and the ongoing efforts to identify their victims.

== See also ==
- Capital punishment in Texas
- Crime in Texas
- List of serial killers in the United States
- List of serial killers by number of victims
- Manipulation (psychology)
- Self-preservation
- Thrill killing

== Cited works and further reading ==
- Anderson, William Bryan (1987). Notable Crime Investigations. C.C. Thomas Publishing. ISBN 978-0-398-05372-7.
- Cawthorne, Nigel; Tibballs, Geoff (1993). Killers. Boxtree. pp. 408–412. ISBN 0-752-20850-0.
- Foreman, Laura (1992). Serial Killers: True Crime. Time-Life Books. ISBN 978-0-783-50001-0.
- Franscell, Ron (2010). Crime Buff's Guide to Outlaw Texas. Guildford Press. ISBN 978-0-762-75965-1.
- Jeffers, H. Paul (1992). Profiles in Evil: Chilling Case Histories from the Files of the FBI's Violent Crime Unit. Warner Publishing. ISBN 978-0-751-50778-2.
- Keppel, Robert D.; Birnes, William J. (2003). The Psychology of Serial Killer Investigations: The Grisly Business Unit. Academic Press. pp. 8–11. ISBN 978-0-124-04260-5.
- Lane, Brian; Gregg, Wilfred (1992). The Encyclopedia of Serial Killers. Headline Publishing. ISBN 978-0-747-23731-0.
- Levin, Jack; Wiest, Julie B. (2018). The Allure of Premeditated Murder: Why Some People Plan to Kill. Rowman & Littlefield Publishers. ISBN 978-1-538-10389-0.
- Rahr, Larry (2016). A Cop for 43 Years. Page Publishing Incorporated. ISBN 978-1-684-09172-0.
- Rosewood, Jack (2015). Dean Corll: The True Story of The Houston Mass Murders. CreateSpace Independent Publishing Platform CreateSpace. ISBN 978-1-517-48500-9.
- Vance, Michael; Lomax, John (2014). Murder and Mayhem in Houston: Historic Bayou City Crime. The History Press. ISBN 978-1-626-19521-9.
- Varhola, Michael O. (2011). Texas Confidential: Sex, Scandal, Murder, and Mayhem in the Lone Star State. Clerisy Press. ISBN 978-1-57860-458-6.
- Whittington-Egan, Richard; Whittington-Egan, Molly (1992). The Murder Almanac. Neil Wilson Publishing. p. 51. ISBN 1-897784-04-X.
- Wilson, Colin (2013). A Plague of Murder: The Rise and Rise of Serial Killing in the Modern Age. Robinson Publishing. ISBN 978-1-854-87249-4.
- Wynn, Douglas (1996). On Trial for Murder. Pan Books. pp. 69–72. ISBN 978-0-330-33947-6.
