= Elmer Wayne Henley =

American serial killer (born 1956)

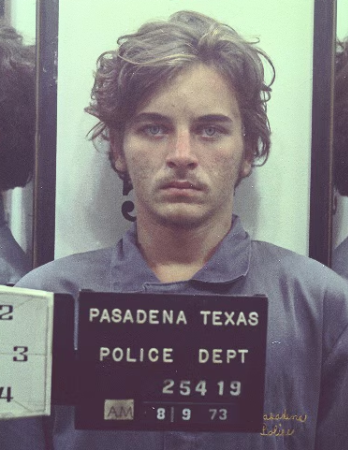
- 1973 mug shot of Henley
- Born: Elmer Wayne Henley Jr. May 9, 1956 (age 70); Houston, Texas, U.S.
- Status: Incarcerated
- Motive: Self-preservation; sadism; loyalty; financial gain
- Conviction: Murder with malice (6 counts)
- Penalty: Life imprisonment

Details
- Victims: Murder with malice: 6 Self-defense: 1
- Span of crimes: March 24, 1972 – July 25, 1973
- Country: United States
- State: Texas
- Date apprehended: August 8, 1973
- Imprisoned at: Telford Unit, Bowie County, Texas

Elmer Wayne Henley Jr. (born May 9, 1956) is an American serial killer and accomplice to murder convicted in 1974 of the murder of six of the twenty-nine known victims of the Houston Mass Murders, which occurred in Houston and Pasadena, Texas, between 1970 and 1973.

One of two known accomplices to Dean Corll, Henley initially assisted Corll in the abduction of the victims before gradually and increasingly participating in their torture, murder and burial. He shot Corll to death on August 8, 1973, when he was seventeen years old, before divulging his knowledge of and participation in the crimes to authorities.

Tried in San Antonio, Henley was convicted of six murders and sentenced to six consecutive terms of 99-years' imprisonment. He was not charged with the death of Corll, which prosecutors had previously ruled had been committed in self-defense. Henley did successfully appeal his conviction, although he was again convicted of six murders in June 1979. He is currently incarcerated within the Telford Unit in Bowie County, Texas.

At the time of the discovery of the crimes, the case was considered the worst example of serial murder in United States history.

== Early life ==
Elmer Wayne Henley Jr. was born on May 9, 1956, in Houston, Texas, the eldest of four sons born to Elmer Wayne Henley Sr. (1938–1986) and Mary Pauline Henley (née Weed) (b. 1937). His parents were both in their teens at the time of his birth, and the couple initially lived with Mary's parents in Houston Heights until they could afford their own home following his father finding employment as a stationary engineer.

As a child, Henley was an avid reader and both an attentive and academically achieving student whose grades saw him typically in the top quarter of his class. He was also markedly religious, and briefly held an aspiration to become a preacher. As his mother and grandparents were devout Christians, this religious devotion was encouraged.

Henley's father was an alcoholic and adulterer who physically assaulted his wife and sons, and the children were largely raised by their mother and maternal grandparents. As a child, Henley strove to protect his mother from his father's violence; she in turn was markedly protective of her children, and often shielded them from her husband's violence. On one occasion as an adolescent, Henley observed his father striking his mother before pushing her into a corner to continue his assault; he successfully prevented his father from further hitting his mother by pointing a shotgun at his father and shouting, "Drop it, Dad!" Although his memories of his father were conflicted, he would later fondly remark of his early childhood: "I have memories of [my father] walking me to school, and of Cub Scout and Boy Scout activities. I went to work with him, and he'd tell me about boilers and air conditioners."

Although Henley's father mistreated and neglected his family, he was present throughout his sons' childhood and early adolescence, and despite the belittling he endured from his father, Henley strove to meet his approval. Although occasionally bullied at school from the fifth grade onward, he was popular among many of his peers—both male and female—and was attracted to the attitudes of the contemporary hippie movement of the late 1960s and early 1970s.

=== Adolescence ===
By his early teens—and particularly following his parents' 1970 divorce—Henley grew disillusioned with school. As the eldest male in the household following his father's departure, he took two simultaneous, menial part-time jobs to assist his mother with household finances, and both his grades and scholastic attendance record dropped sharply. He also developed a habit of drinking alcohol and smoking marijuana in addition to becoming a small-time drug dealer. Henley's mother—who worked as a cashier at a parking lot—retained custody of her four sons following her divorce. Both of Henley's parents later remarried, although Henley's father did arrive, uninvited, at the reception for Henley's mother's second marriage. On this occasion, when Henley attempted to persuade his father to leave, his father shoved him to the ground and then ran to retrieve a gun from his car, attempting to shoot his son; he wounded a friend who threw himself atop Henley to shield him from his father in the process. Henley's father was charged with attempted murder for this incident, although Henley refused to testify against him in court. (Note: Henley's mother's second marriage was soon annulled.)

Within a year of his parents' divorce, Henley dropped out of high school. He would later develop a minor criminal record, being arrested for assault with a deadly weapon in 1971 and burglary one year later.

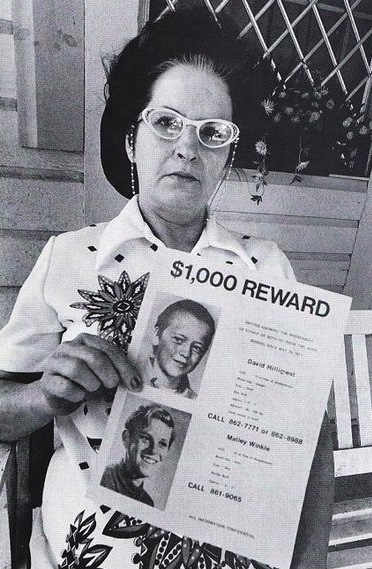
The mother of Gregory Malley Winkle holds a flyer offering a reward for information leading to the whereabouts of her son and David Hilligiest

In the year Henley dropped out of high school, he became aware of an insidious pattern of disappearances in his neighborhood: since the previous December, a minimum of eight boys aged 13 to 17 had disappeared from Houston Heights. Henley had been a lifelong friend with one of the youths, 13-year-old David William Hilligiest, who had disappeared on the afternoon of May 29, 1971, while walking to the Bohemian Lodge swimming pool with his 16-year-old friend Gregory Malley Winkle. Henley himself had actively participated in the search for the two, including distributing flyers offering a $1,000 reward for information leading to the teenagers' whereabouts and attempting to reassure Hilligiest's parents that there may be an innocent explanation for the teenagers' prolonged absence. (Note: Following the revelation of Henley's subsequent involvement in the murders initiated by Corll, the mother of David Hilligiest would recollect: "He (Henley) would ask if we had heard anything... and he would look off into the distance. Looking back, I can see he was carrying a burden he was trying to sedate.)

=== Encounter with David Brooks ===
Prior to dropping out of school, Henley had become acquainted with another student one year his senior named David Owen Brooks. The two encountered each other in approximately October 1971 as Henley—opting to truant from Hamilton Junior High School—walked away from the entrance in the direction of a local pool hall. Brooks fell into stride alongside him and asked if he was "skipping school too". When Henley replied he was, Brooks offered to keep him company for the day, adding he also attended Hamilton Junior High and that the pool hall was also his intended destination. The two began to truant together regularly, and through his acquaintance with Brooks, Henley became aware that not only did his friend drive a 1969 Chevrolet Corvette and always seem to have money despite not having a job and hailing from a family of modest means, but that he spent a lot of his free time in the company of an older man with whom he himself gradually became a casual acquaintance: Dean Corll.

== Introduction to Dean Corll ==
Initially, Henley was oblivious to the true extent of Corll's and Brooks's relationship, although Brooks and Corll began making a point of meeting him at the gas station where he worked part-time to exchange small talk. Henley later stated that though he admired Corll because he worked hard and seemed to have his life in order, he also suspected that Corll was homosexual, and initially concluded that Brooks was "hustling himself a queer." As Henley began to spend more time in their company, he also became aware of stark contrasts in Corll's persona; much of the time, Corll was affable and somewhat childlike, leading both Henley and Brooks to nickname him "Deannie Weannie", but occasionally he would be agitated, serious, and chain-smoke.

On one occasion in the winter of 1971–72, Brooks informed Henley that if he was able to leave his home "without telling anyone where [he was] going", he and Corll would pick him up behind the Fulbright Methodist Church close to his home at 5 p.m. that afternoon. Henley agreed, and Brooks and Corll picked him up at the agreed time and drove him to Corll's address—likely as an intended victim. In his confession given almost two years later, Henley informed detectives Brooks lured him to Corll's home on the promise that he could participate in "a deal where I could make some money." However, this initial plan was thwarted when Henley informed Corll that, contrary to Brooks's prior instructions not to do so, he had informed his mother and grandmother he was leaving the family home in Brooks's company to meet him for the first time.

Despite this initial setback, Corll evidently decided the youth would make a good accomplice, and Henley soon began spending increasing amounts of time in Corll's company and gradually began to view him as something of a "brother-type person" whose work ethic he admired and in whom he could confide. Corll also allowed Henley—who had no driving license—to occasionally drive his Plymouth GTX. Initially, Corll told Henley that he was involved in organized theft, and if he had anything of value—stolen or otherwise—to sell to him, he would be able to resell the wares for his own profit. He, Brooks and Henley also burglarized several local addresses, for which Henley was paid small sums of money. Shortly thereafter, Corll suggested to Henley he should advance from burglary to more serious crimes. On one occasion, in an apparent test of character, Corll asked Henley if he would be willing to kill if cornered while burglarizing a property, to which Henley replied, "Yes." Shortly thereafter, as Corll and Henley sat in a vehicle at the corner of Eleventh and Heights Boulevard, Corll stated to the teenager: "You know, it's too bad there's not a market in people, they're everywhere."

Over the course of several subsequent conversations, Corll repeatedly referred to the topic of human trafficking before informing Henley that he was involved in a "white slavery ring" operating from Dallas, in which teenage boys were sold as houseboys to wealthy clients across the country and that he would pay him $200 (the equivalent of approximately $1,670 as of 2026) for any teenage boy he could lure to his apartment. Corll referred to this organization as "the Syndicate".

=== Initial abduction ===
Henley has always insisted that he ignored Corll's offer of $200 for every boy he could lure to his apartment for several months, but that in approximately February 1972, he decided he would "help find a boy" for Corll as his family was in dire financial circumstances. According to Henley's subsequent confession, he resolved to participate in a sole abduction as he could use the money "to get better things for my [family], so one day I went over to Dean's place on Schuler Street and told him I would get a boy for him."

At Corll's home, Henley agreed to enact a previous ruse he and Corll had privately rehearsed in which they would lure a youth to Corll's home and Henley would then cuff his hands behind his back, release himself with a key discreetly hidden in his pocket, then con the victim into placing the handcuffs upon himself. The pair then drove around the Heights to search for a victim. At the corner of 11th and Studewood, Henley persuaded a dark-haired youth to enter Corll's Plymouth GTX. The victim agreed to accompany the two to Corll's apartment on the promise of smoking some marijuana. At Corll's address, Henley helped con the teenager into donning the handcuffs, then watched Corll pounce on the youth, bind his hands and feet with parachute cord, then place adhesive tape over his mouth. Brooks then drove Henley home, telling him the Syndicate did not yet know of his participation and thus he should not be present when they arrived to collect the captive. The next day, Corll paid Henley $200, informing him the teenager had been sold into the slavery ring as a houseboy. Henley gave most of the money to his mother, but also bought himself a Sheridan air rifle.

The identity of this first victim in whose abduction Henley assisted remains unknown.

== Participation in murders ==
=== Schuler Street ===
One month later, on the evening of March 24, 1972, Henley, in the company of Corll and Brooks, encountered an 18-year-old acquaintance of his named Frank Anthony Aguirre leaving a restaurant on Yale Street, where the youth worked. Aguirre was persuaded to accompany Henley to Corll's home on the promise of drinking beer and smoking marijuana with them. Aguirre agreed and followed the trio to Corll's home in his Rambler. Inside Corll's house, Aguirre smoked marijuana with the trio before picking up a pair of handcuffs Corll had deliberately left on his table. In response, Corll pounced on Aguirre, pushed him onto the table, and cuffed his hands behind his back.

Henley later claimed that he had not known of Corll's true intentions towards Aguirre when he persuaded his friend to accompany him to Corll's home, and to still at this stage be oblivious to Corll's true intentions toward teenagers he or Brooks brought to him; he later claimed to have been startled upon seeing Corll suddenly "jump" upon Aguirre after the teenager had idly placed one handcuff upon his own wrist and to have attempted to dissuade Corll from raping and killing Aguirre. However, Corll refused, informing Henley that he had raped, tortured, and killed the previous victim he had assisted in abducting, and that Aguirre was to suffer the same fate. Brooks then drove Henley home.

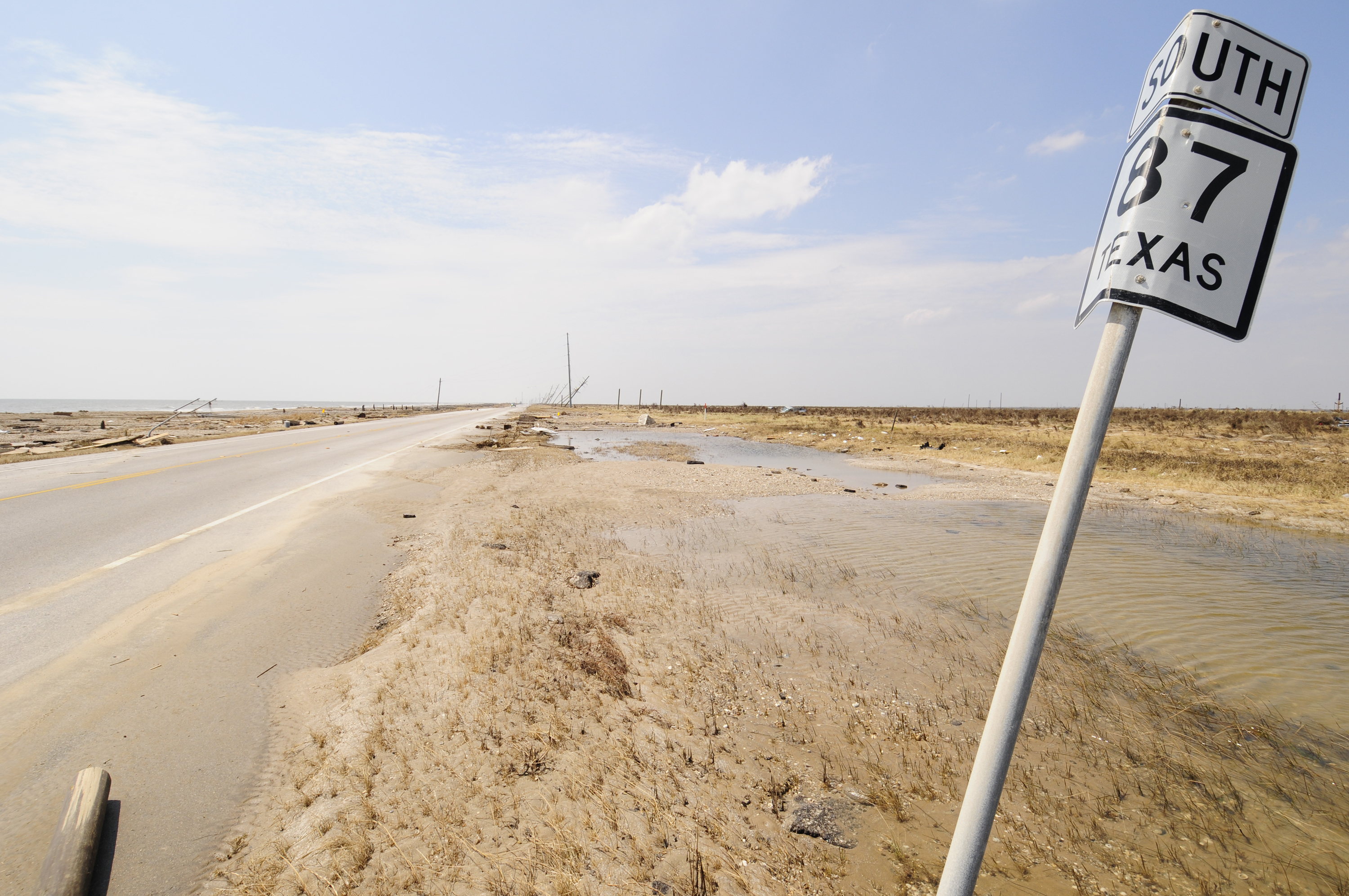
High Island Beach. Henley and Brooks began assisting Corll in burying his victims at this location in March 1972.

The following evening, Henley assisted Corll and Brooks in burying Aguirre's body at High Island Beach. Corll and Brooks later informed Henley that his childhood friend, David Hilligiest, and Hilligiest's swimming companion, Gregory Malley Winkle, had also died at his hands and that as such, there was no use in continuing to search for them.

Despite the revelations to the reality of the fate of the boys brought to Corll, Henley continued to assist in the abductions and murders. Less than one month later, Henley lured a 17-year-old youth whom both he and Brooks well knew named Mark Steven Scott to Corll's apartment. Scott was specifically chosen by Corll to be his next victim as he occasionally sold stolen property to Corll and had "recently cheated [Corll] on a deal", thus causing Corll to hold extreme animosity toward him. According to Henley, shortly prior to this abduction, either he or Corll had accidentally burned themselves on one of Henley's incense cones, and this incident had inspired Corll to torture Scott via this method.

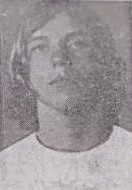
Mark Scott

On April 20, Henley encountered Scott walking down a Heights alleyway close to 23rd Street and persuaded him to accompany him to Corll's apartment. Scott was grabbed by force and fought furiously against attempts by Corll and Brooks to restrain him, even attempting to stab Corll with a knife the following morning after several hours of abuse and torture; however, according to Brooks, Scott "just gave up" after seeing Henley point a .22 caliber pistol toward him. As had been the case with Frank Aguirre, Scott was strangled and buried at High Island Beach, although on this occasion, Henley strangled Scott into unconsciousness with a length of cord before Corll completed the murder.

Brooks later stated Henley was "especially sadistic" in his participation in the murders committed at Schuler Street and Henley later admitted to gradually becoming "fascinated" with "how much stamina people have" when subjected to the act of murder, with Corll alternately bestowing praise on his accomplices and goading them—but particularly Henley—to prove their loyalty and worth to him. On May 21, Henley entered Corll's apartment to observe two Heights youths, Billy Gene Baulch Jr. (17) and Johnny Ray Delome (16), socializing with Corll and Brooks. He assisted Corll and Brooks in subduing the teenagers, both of whom were bound, then tied to Corll's bed. Corll then suggested Henley sexually assault one boy while he assaulted the other, but Henley refused. Both were then forced to write letters to their parents—dated May 23 and posted from Madisonville—claiming they had found employment with a truck driver "loading and unloading from Houston to Washington" before Corll proceeded to rape them prior to their torture.

In Brooks's confession, he stated that both youths were tied to Corll's bed and, after their torture and rape, Henley strangled Baulch to death, with the process lasting almost thirty minutes; he then shouted, "Hey, Johnny!" and shot Delome in the forehead with Corll's .22 caliber pistol, with the bullet exiting through the youth's ear. Several minutes later, Delome pleaded with Henley, "Wayne, please don't!" before he was strangled to death by both Corll and Henley. Both youths were later buried at High Island Beach.

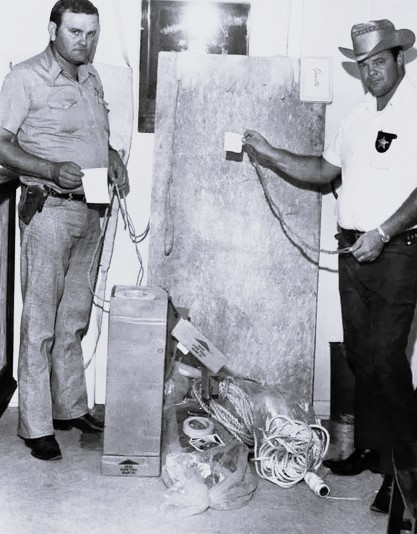
One of two torture boards constructed by Corll. Most victims abducted after May 1972 were restrained to this device.

In part due to the fact Mark Scott had managed to partially free himself while bound and had almost succeeded in stabbing Corll, in approximately June 1972, Corll constructed a further plywood torture board measuring 8 by 2.5 feet (2.44 by 0.76 m) with handcuffs and ropes affixed to both sides of each corner in order to securely restrain his victim or victims. A further hole was drilled into the top center of the board in order that the device could be hung upon a wall. Thus, many future victims were restrained to this device as opposed to Corll's bed or other devices, and on the occasions where Corll restrained two victims to this device, one would be forced to watch the abuse inflicted upon the other to increase the victims' psychological torture.

=== Summer–winter 1972 ===
Corll moved to an apartment at Westcott Towers in June 1972. Within one month, on July 19, a 17-year-old teenager named Steven Kent Sickman had been murdered by strangulation and buried in a boat shed Corll rented in Southwest Houston. His murder was followed approximately one month later by that of 19-year-old Roy Eugene Bunton, who was bound, gagged with a section of Turkish towel and adhesive tape, then killed by two gunshots to the head before also being buried in the boat shed. Neither victim was named or referenced by either accomplice, and it is unknown whether Henley or Brooks assisted with either abduction or murder.

On October 3, Henley and Brooks abducted two Heights boys named Wally Jay Simoneaux and Richard Edward Hembree as they walked home from Hamilton Junior High School. Both were enticed into Brooks's Chevrolet Corvette and driven to Corll's Westcott Towers address. That evening, Simoneaux is known to have phoned his mother, Mildred, and to have shouted the word "Mama" into the receiver before the connection was terminated. At approximately 7 a.m. the following day, Hembree was accidentally shot in the mouth by Henley who, according to Brooks's confession, "just came in (the room where the two boys were bound) waving the .22 and accidentally shot one of the boys in the jaw." The bullet exited Hembree's neck, although both were kept alive for approximately twelve further hours before they were strangled to death that evening. Simoneaux and Hembree were later buried in the boat shed.

One month later, on November 11, a 19-year-old named Richard Alan Kepner was abducted while walking to call his fiancée from a pay phone. Kepner hailed from Humble, Texas, but had relocated to Spring Branch shortly before his disappearance to train as a carpenter's helper. His strangled body was buried at High Island Beach, and Henley is known to have assisted Corll and Brooks in this particular abduction and murder.

Sometime in November 1972, an 18-year-old Oak Forest youth known to both Corll and Henley named Willard Karmon Branch Jr. disappeared while hitchhiking from Mount Pleasant to Houston. Branch was gagged, emasculated and shot once above the left ear before his body was buried in the boat shed. (Note: Some accounts state Branch was abducted in February 1972. However, the Office of the Medical Examiner of Harris County lists Branch's death as having occurred in November 1972.)

=== 1973 ===
On January 20, 1973, Corll moved to the Princessa Apartments on Wirt Road in the Spring Branch district of Houston. Two weeks later, on February 3, he abducted and killed 17-year-old Joseph Allen Lyles. Lyles had known both Corll and Brooks for several months prior to his disappearance; he had lived on Antoine Drive—the same street upon which Brooks resided in early 1973. According to Brooks, Corll had wanted him to assist in restraining Lyles, but he refused; in response, Corll overpowered and bound the teen before Brooks hurriedly left Corll's apartment. Lyles's body was later buried on a sandbank on Jefferson County Beach. (Note: Lyles's body would remain undiscovered until August 1983.)

One month later, on March 1, Corll vacated the Princessa Apartments; he briefly resided in an apartment on South Post Oak Road before moving into his father's residence at 2020 Lamar Drive in Pasadena on March 19. Corll briefly lived with his father, stepmother and half-brother at this address before they vacated the property.

==== Distancing efforts ====
Lyles's abduction and murder was committed without the assistance or knowledge of Henley, who had spontaneously chosen to travel from Texas to Florida with his uncle, a long-haul truck driver, in January 1973 before then traveling from Florida to visit another uncle in Atlanta, Georgia. Henley did try to divulge Corll's crimes and his involvement in them to this uncle, but he simply believed Henley was either morbidly fantasizing or had a psychiatric disorder, and ordered Henley to return to his mother. Weeks after returning to Houston, Henley traveled to Mount Pleasant in a further effort to distance himself from Corll. Two weeks later, he received a phone call from David Brooks likely made at Corll's behest in which Brooks stated he could not guarantee the safety of one of his younger brothers or the younger brother of David Hilligiest if he did not return home. Henley returned to live with his mother in April 1973. (Note: Reflecting on his ambivalent attitude toward Corll, his crimes, and his own involvement in the murders, Henley would later reflect: "My life was kind of schizophrenic. I could get away from Dean and live normal. I could hang out with my friends, see my girlfriends, barbecue with the family, but there was always an undercurrent of fear waiting for Dean to show up. At the same time, I was fearful of being left out ... I didn't feel anchored anymore because the anchor was Dean. When I was with Dean, everything seemed to focus on him, so everything is all right, as long as Dean is all right. When I was away from Dean, then I had misgivings and felt responsible and guilty ... He was never able to make me guilt-free.")

In a further effort to distance himself from Corll, Henley attempted to enlist in the U.S. Navy as a boatswain's mate in the spring of 1973; his application was rejected on June 28 because a color perception test revealed he was color-blind and ineligible for recruitment. Furthermore, although a later intelligence test would reveal Henley's IQ to be 126, he had dropped out of high school and possessed a limited formal education. In a 2010 interview, Henley stated: "I couldn't leave anyway. If I did go, I knew Dean would go after one of my little brothers, who he always liked a little too much."

He was escalating. I think he knew I was reaching saturation. I was drinking worse and worse ... he knew I was trying to get away. His episodes were becoming more vicious and hurried. The feeling I had was that Dean would soon kill me or kill both of us ... I believe Dean not only was losing control of his own self, but [also knew he] was losing control of me.

— Elmer Wayne Henley, describing the increasing friction and distrust between himself and Corll during the summer of 1973 to authors Katherine Ramsland and Tracy Ullman (2022).

=== 2020 Lamar Drive ===
Both Henley and Brooks later testified to the increase in the level of brutality of the murders committed while Corll resided at Lamar Drive; both also sensed Corll was increasingly losing his sense of self-control while becoming suspicious of both accomplices. Henley later likened the dramatic increase in sadism inflicted upon the victims and the frequency in which Corll insisted his accomplices lure victims to his home to being "like a blood lust" in which he insisted Henley in particular actively participate.

On Monday, June 4, 1973, Corll ordered Henley to "bring [him] a boy". In response, Henley lured a 15-year-old acquaintance named William Ray Lawrence to Corll's Pasadena residence upon the promise of fishing with himself and Corll at Lake Sam Rayburn in San Augustine County. Lawrence last phoned his father to state he and "some friends" were traveling to Lake Sam Rayburn, but that he would return to Houston in "two, three days ... maybe Thursday." Due to the fact Corll "really liked [Lawrence]", the teenager was kept alive for three days, throughout which he was almost continually bound to Corll's bed. After three days of abuse and torture, Lawrence was strangled to death with a ligature. Corll and Brooks buried his body close to a dirt road at Lake Sam Rayburn the following evening as Henley kept a lookout in Corll's Ford Econoline van.

Less than two weeks later, a 20-year-old married man from Baton Rouge, Louisiana, named Raymond Stanley Blackburn was abducted while hitchhiking from the Heights to Louisiana to see his wife and newborn child; he was strangled to death by Corll and buried at Lake Sam Rayburn. Blackburn had arrived in Houston three months before his abduction to work on a construction project. Three weeks later, on July 6, Henley began attending classes at the Coaches Driving School in Bellaire, Texas, where he became acquainted with a 15-year-old named Homer Louis Garcia. The following day, Garcia telephoned his mother to say he was spending the night with a friend from the driving school, whom he refused to name; he was shot and left to bleed to death in Corll's bathtub before his body was buried at Lake Sam Rayburn. Five days later, on July 12, a 17-year-old Orange County youth and U.S. Marine named John Manning Sellars was shot to death with a rifle and buried at High Island Beach.

The day after Sellars' disappearance, Brooks married his pregnant 15-year-old fiancée, Bridget Clark; the two moved into an apartment together, although he continued to maintain contact with Corll and Henley.

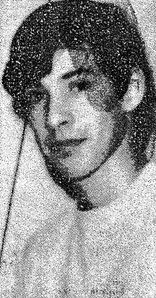
Homer Garcia

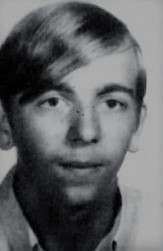
Marty Jones

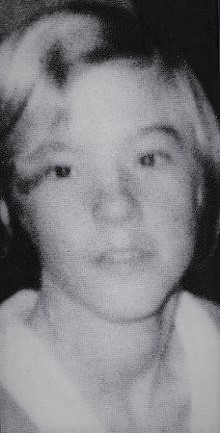
James Dreymala

On July 19, Corll and Henley encountered 15-year-old Michael Anthony Baulch, younger brother of previous victim Billy Baulch, walking home from a barber's shop. He was lured to Corll's residence upon an unknown pretext. Baulch was strangled to death with a cord before his body was buried at Lake Sam Rayburn just 10 feet (3 m) from the body of Homer Garcia. Six days later, on Corll's instructions, Henley lured two Heights youths named Charles Cary Cobble (17) and Marty Ray Jones (18) to Corll's home. The trio were last seen by a friend of Henley's named Johnny Reyna walking in single file along 27th Street. Two days later, Jones was strangled to death as Cobble, observing his friend's murder, went into cardiac arrest; Henley partially resuscitated Cobble before Corll ordered him to stop. He then shot Cobble twice in the head. Henley buried the youths in the center of Corll's boat shed, with Corll briefly locking him inside the shed while he retrieved bags of lime to spread over their bodies.

On Friday, August 3, Corll encountered a 13-year-old boy from South Houston named James Stanton Dreymala riding his bicycle close to his parents' home. Upon learning Dreymala was saving money to take his first girlfriend to see the latest James Bond movie that Sunday, Corll lured the boy to his home on the pretext of his collecting empty glass bottles from his shed to collect the deposit for their return. That evening, Brooks observed Dreymala at Corll's home; he ordered a pizza, which he shared with the boy before leaving him alone with Corll. Dreymala later called his parents to request if he could stay overnight at a party across town; his parents informed him to return home, although shortly thereafter, Dreymala was tied to Corll's torture board, raped, tortured, and strangled with a cord before being buried close to the entrance of Corll's boat shed.

== August 8, 1973 ==
On the evening of August 7, 1973, Henley invited 20-year-old Timothy Cordell Kerley to attend a party at Corll's Pasadena residence. Kerley—a casual acquaintance of Corll whom Corll intended to be his next victim—accepted the offer. Brooks was not present at the time. The two youths arrived at Corll's house, where they sniffed paint fumes and drank alcohol until midnight before leaving the house, promising to return shortly. Henley and Kerley then drove back to Houston Heights and Kerley parked his Volkswagen close to Henley's home. The two exited the vehicle and Henley, hearing commotion across the street emanating from the home of his 15-year-old friend Rhonda Louise Williams, walked toward her home. (Note: Williams had previously been the girlfriend of victim Frank Aguirre. Following Aguirre's murder, Henley had informed her on several occasions she should cease lamenting his disappearance and hoping he would return, as he "[had] a feeling" he would never return home.) Williams had been beaten by her drunken father that evening and—determined to run away from home—had packed several basic belongings into an overnight bag before seeking temporary refuge in a laundromat close to her home, where Henley encountered her. Williams accepted Henley's invitation to join him and Kerley at Corll's home. The trio then drove toward Corll's residence, arriving at approximately 3:00 a.m.

Corll was furious that a girl had been brought to his house, telling Henley in private he had "ruined everything." Externally, however, Corll remained calm, and Henley, Williams and Kerley began drinking and smoking marijuana, with Henley and Kerley also sniffing acrylic paint fumes as Corll watched the trio intently before apparently retiring to bed. After approximately two hours, Henley, Kerley and Williams each passed out.

Henley woke to find himself gagged and pinioned face-down with Corll placing handcuffs upon his wrists. Kerley and Williams had each been bound and gagged and lay alongside Henley on the floor, with Kerley having been stripped naked. Corll informed Henley he was furious he had brought a girl to his home, thus thwarting his plans to assault and torture Kerley, stating, "Man, you blew it bringing that girl" before repeatedly kicking Williams in the chest and shouting, "Wake up, bitch!"

When all three had woken, Corll began shouting as he waved an eighteen-inch hunting knife at the trio: "I'm gonna kill you all! But first I'm gonna have my fun!" He then dragged Henley into his kitchen and placed a .22 caliber pistol against his stomach, threatening to shoot him. Henley pleaded for his life, promising to participate in the torture and murder of the others if Corll released him. After several minutes, Corll agreed and untied Henley, then separately carried Kerley and Williams into his bedroom and tied them to opposite sides of his plywood torture board placed above a layer of thick plastic sheeting: Kerley on his stomach; Williams on her back. He then placed a transistor radio attached to a pair of dry cells between Kerley and Williams before turning the volume to maximum to drown any shouting and screaming.

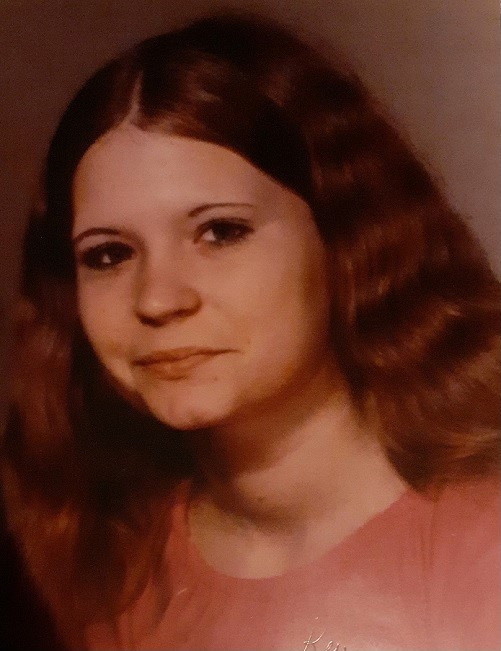
Rhonda Louise Williams. Her presence inside Corll's home on August 8 was instrumental in inspiring Henley to kill Corll.

Henley was handed a long hunting knife by Corll, who ordered him to cut away Williams's clothes, insisting that he would rape and kill Kerley and ordering Henley to do likewise to Williams, shouting, "What are you waiting for?" Henley then began cutting off Williams's trousers and underwear as Corll placed the pistol upon a bedside table, undressed and climbed on top of Kerley.

=== Shooting of Corll ===
As Corll began to assault and torture Kerley, Henley continued cutting away Williams's clothes with the hunting knife that Corll had handed him. As he did so, Williams, whose gag Henley had removed, lifted her head and asked Henley, "Is this for real?" Henley replied in the affirmative and Williams asked: "Are you going to do anything about it?" This statement unnerved Henley, but evidently inspired him to act. After standing and pacing the room for several minutes as he huffed from a sack of acrylic paint fumes, he observed the pistol Corll had placed on the bedside table. After asking Corll, "Hey, Dean. Why don't you let me take the chick in the other room? She doesn't want to see this," and receiving no response, Henley grabbed the pistol and ordered Corll to stop what he was doing, shouting, "You've gone far enough, Dean! I can't go on any longer ... I can't have you kill all my friends!"

Even with a weapon pointed at him, Corll was not cowed: he clambered off Kerley, stood and slowly walked towards Henley, shouting, "Kill me, Wayne! You won't do it!" Henley fired a round at Corll, hitting him in the forehead. As Corll continued to advance upon him, Henley fired a further two rounds into his left shoulder—one of which penetrated his lung and lodged in his spine. Corll began coughing up blood as he ran out of the room, trapping his foot in a rotary telephone wire and staggering toward the wall of the hallway. Henley fired three additional bullets into his lower back and shoulder as Corll slid down the wall, killing him.

== Contacting authorities ==
After Henley had shot Corll, he and Kerley began weeping as Kerley repeatedly thanked him for saving his life and Williams screamed for him to release her. (Note: Discussing his mindset and emotions immediately after shooting Corll, Henley would recollect in 2022: "I think the reason I broke down and cried after shooting Dean was because my life was ended. I had finally accepted that anything was preferable than to continue with Dean ... I was also closing off a part of my life I had clung to regardless of consequences. I cried because I lost Dean, lost my life, lost my childhood, accepted death, and was just plain relieved ... From the minute Dean tied us up that morning, it was only going to end with [either] Dean's or Rhonda's and Tim's deaths. I would have accepted Dean allowing us to leave, but I also know, now, that only Dean's death was going to release me.") Although Henley initially contemplated simply fleeing the scene, he looked up the number for the Pasadena Police Department (PPD) in Corll's telephone directory, blurting to the operator at 8:24 a.m.: "Y'all better come here right now! I just killed a man!"

As the trio sat on the curb outside Corll's home waiting for the police to arrive, Henley slumped forward, weeping and rocking back and forth with his head in his hands as Williams—also weeping—draped one arm across his shoulder and attempted to reassure him everything would "be alright". As Kerley stared vacantly across the street, Henley mentioned to him that he had "done that (killing by shooting) four or five times." (Note: Kerley would also later inform investigators Henley also informed him: "If you wasn't my friend, I could have gotten $200 for you.")

Minutes later, Officer Jerry Jamison arrived at Lamar Drive. Henley informed Jamison that he was the individual who had contacted the police and indicated that he had "killed a man inside [the house]". Jamison placed all three inside his patrol car before entering the property to observe the body of Dean Corll sprawled face-down in the hallway; he then returned to his car and read all three their Miranda rights. In response, Henley shouted: "I don't care who knows about it! I have to get it off my chest!" Jamison then called for a detective unit to transport the three to the PPD. En route, one of the officers noted that Henley repeatedly mentioned the decedent had "a warehouse or small storage room where [the decedent] had buried some bodies".

The PPD initially questioned Henley about the killing of Corll; he recounted the events of the previous evening and that morning, explaining that he had shot Corll in self-defense after he had bound, then threatened to kill all three and he had persuaded Corll to release him. His accounts were corroborated by Kerley and Williams—both of whom indicated Henley had likely saved their lives. As such, the detective questioning Henley believed he had indeed acted in self-defense.

=== Initial statements ===
When questioned regarding his earlier claim that as Corll had threatened to kill Williams, Kerley and himself that morning, Corll had shouted that he had killed several boys, and that investigators had noted the floor of the room where the three had been bound, assaulted and threatened was covered in thick plastic sheeting in addition to locating numerous dildos, rolls of binding tape, a tube of petroleum jelly, pairs of handcuffs and a toolbox containing thin glass tubes within the property, Henley explained that since the winter of 1971–72, he had actively participated in the abductions and, later, murders of several victims. Corll had offered to pay him $200 for each victim he was able to lure to his apartment, although he had never received any significant sums of money for any victim following the first abduction. He also divulged that David Brooks had also been an active accomplice – albeit for a longer period of time than he.

Henley insisted that he had initially believed the boys he abducted were to be sold into a Dallas-based organization for "homosexual acts, sodomy, maybe later killing," but that he soon learned that Corll himself was murdering the victims procured. He also gradually admitted to having assisted Corll in several murders, in addition to having actively participated in the torture of "six or eight" victims prior to their murder, also informing police that Corll had buried most of his victims in a boat shed in Southwest Houston, and others at Lake Sam Rayburn and High Island Beach.

Although police were initially skeptical, Henley remained adamant as to his claims; he also provided investigators with the names of three Heights teenagers whom he and Brooks had procured for Corll: Cobble, Hilligiest, and Jones. A call to the Houston Police Department (HPD) headquarters revealed all three had been reported missing from Houston Heights. Hilligiest had been reported missing in the summer of 1971; the other two boys had been missing for just two weeks. He agreed to accompany police to each of the burial sites to assist in the recovery of the victims, beginning with the boat shed where he insisted the three victims whose names he had initially provided detectives—Cobble, Hilligiest, and Jones—had been buried.

== Search for victims ==
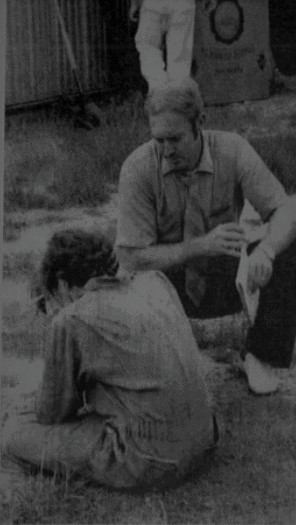
Henley, pictured outside Corll's boat shed on August 8, 1973

Seventeen victims in varying stages of decomposition would be recovered from the boat shed on August 8 and 9, with four separate arm bones not belonging to any victim—each appendage later confirmed to belong to the same individual—also recovered on the second day of the search. All of the victims found had been sodomized and most victims found bore evidence of having been subjected to brutality and sexual torture: pubic hairs had been plucked out, (Note: Henley would later describe Corll's practice of pulling pubic hairs from the victims as a "coercion technique" undertaken to ensure the victims' compliance in the sexual abuse inflicted upon them.) objects had been inserted into their rectums, and glass rods had been inserted into their urethrae and smashed. Cloth rags had also been inserted into the victims' mouths and adhesive tape wound around their faces to muffle their screams. One victim had been emasculated, whereas the penis of another victim had been almost completely severed by human teeth. The eighth victim recovered was found buried with an electrical cord with alligator clips attached to each end; the thirteenth and fourteenth bodies unearthed bore identification cards naming the victims as brothers Donald and Jerry Waldrop, whereas the body of the fifteenth victim had suffered several fractured ribs prior to his murder.

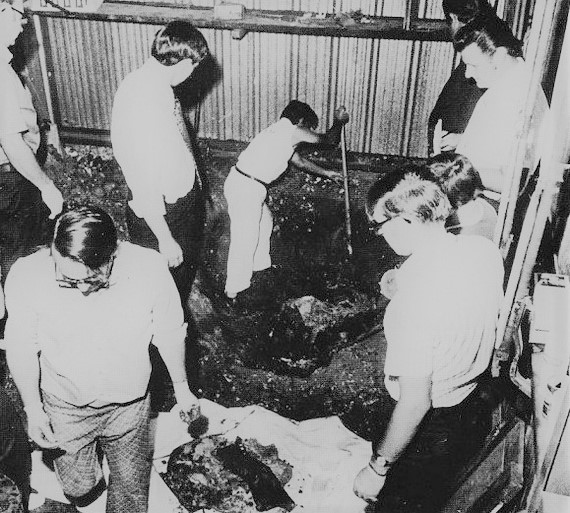
Investigators uncover a multiple grave inside Corll's boat shed on August 8

As the first bodies were unearthed and prior to developments pertaining to Corll's death being reported via media, a reporter for Houston's NBC television affiliate KPRC-TV named Jack Cato overheard Henley pleading with investigators to allow him to phone his mother. He offered Henley the use of his mobile radio telephone to call his mother prior to her learning via media of police developments. When Henley's mother answered the telephone, Henley stated, "It's Wayne", to which his mother replied, "Yes, this is Mama, baby." Henley then blurted the words, "Mama ... I killed Dean" into the receiver, confessing that he had killed Dean Corll and was "at that warehouse he keeps" with the police. The entire conversation was captured on film, and was broadcast nationwide by NBC Nightly News that evening.

=== Further discoveries and full confessions ===
Accompanied by his father, David Brooks presented himself at HPD headquarters on the evening of August 8. He provided a statement in which he admitted to having known Corll since 1967 and that, beginning in 1969, he had allowed Corll to perform oral sex upon him for money, for which he was paid up to $10. Initially, Brooks denied any knowledge of or participation in the murders although he admitted to having known that Corll had raped and killed two teenagers while residing at an apartment on Yorktown in late 1970, and that, in return for his silence in this matter, Corll had bought him the green 1969 Chevrolet Corvette he drove. He then elaborated: "When Dean had a place on Schuler, he was hanging around with Mark Scott, and before that, he was with Ruben Watson. They both disappeared—maybe he killed them."

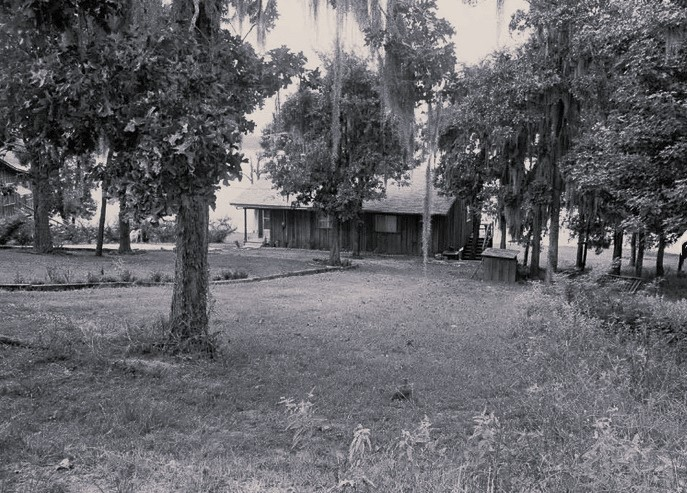
The lakeside log cabin owned by Corll's family at Lake Sam Rayburn. Four victims would be discovered at this location on August 9 and 10, 1973.

On the morning of August 9, Henley gave a full written confession detailing his involvement with Corll and Brooks in the abduction and murder of numerous victims over the previous eighteen months. In this confession, Henley readily admitted to having participated in approximately eleven abductions and to have personally killed several victims by either strangulation or shooting, adding that Brooks "was with us on most of them". Although he had initially believed the victims were to be sold as houseboys to the organization Corll had claimed to belong to, he had soon discovered Corll was raping and killing his victims, although he continued to assist Corll and Brooks in the crimes. Furthermore, Henley insisted that although Corll had paid him the agreed sum of $200 for the first victim he had lured to his home, he had never paid him any further fees for participating in the abductions and murders. After providing his statement, Henley spoke with his mother, informing her he had confessed everything and urging her to "be happy for me, because now, at last, I can live". That afternoon, Henley accompanied police to Lake Sam Rayburn. Two additional bodies were found in shallow, lime-soaked graves in woodland located approximately one hundred yards from the nearest road. (Note: Henley submitted to a press interview at Lake Sam Rayburn on the afternoon of August 9. When questioned by a reporter named Larry Conners as to what Brooks's role had been in the abductions and murders, Henley simply replied, "Same as mine.") Inside the lakeside log cabin owned by Corll's family at this location, police found a second plywood torture board, rolls of plastic sheeting, shovels, and a sack of lime.

After conferring privately with his father, Brooks gave a full confession on the morning of August 10 in which he admitting being present at several killings and assisting in several burials, although he continued to deny any direct participation in the murders—insisting he "never actually killed anyone but was in the room when [the murders occurred] and was supposed to help if something went wrong". According to Brooks, Henley's role had initially been the same as his, but Henley soon actively participated in the torture and murder of many of the victims killed from early 1972 onward and that he "seemed to enjoy causing pain", being particularly sadistic in the murders committed while Corll had resided at Schuler Street.

When questioned about the plywood torture board found at Corll's home, Brooks stated that many victims had been restrained to this device, particularly if Corll intended to keep them alive for extended periods of time, adding: "Once they went on the board, they were as good as dead ... it was all over but the shouting and the crying." Brooks's confession estimated Corll had killed between twenty-five and thirty boys, most of whom had been buried in the boat shed, with approximately four buried at Lake Sam Rayburn, and "five or more" victims to be located at High Island Beach. He agreed to assist investigators in locating the victims buried at the beach.

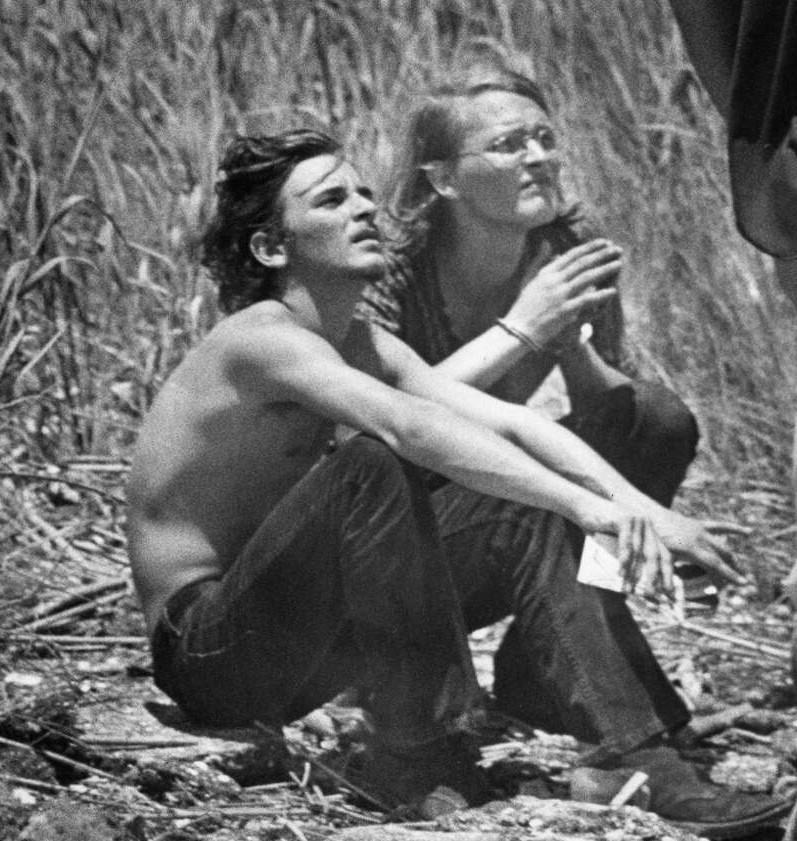
Henley (left) and David Brooks (right), pictured at High Island Beach. August 10, 1973.

On August 10, Henley again accompanied police to Lake Sam Rayburn, where two more bodies were found buried alongside a dirt track just 10 feet (3 m) apart. That afternoon, both Henley and Brooks accompanied police to High Island Beach, leading police to the shallow graves of two further victims, both of whom were markedly decomposed. Four further victims would be located at High Island Beach on August 13, making a total of 27 known victims—at the time the worst case of serial murder, in terms of the number of victims, in the United States. (Note: The body of a seventh victim buried at High Island, Mark Scott, still lies undiscovered at this location, and the body of victim Joseph Lyles would be found buried at Jefferson County Beach in August 1983.)

All the victims found were males between the ages of thirteen and twenty, many of whom had been sexually tortured and severely beaten in addition to being sexually assaulted. Autopsies revealed each victim had been killed by either strangulation, shooting or a combination of both.

=== Disputed victim ===
One of the six bodies found buried at High Island, that of 17-year-old John Manning Sellars, was later disputed as being a victim of Corll by Harris County Medical Examiner Joseph Alexander Jachimczyk. Sellars had died of four gunshot wounds fired from a rifle, whereas all the known victims of the Houston Mass Murders had either been strangled or killed with the same .22 caliber pistol Henley had used to kill Corll. The official tally of victims was reduced to twenty-six in 1974 after Dr. Jachimczyk testified Sellars "probably was not" murdered by Corll and his accomplices.

Henley and Brooks had not led police to Sellars' body, and neither specifically mentioned the teenager as being a victim. The grave site had been revealed to investigators by a truck driver on August 13, and was located over two miles from the other five victims buried at this location. Nonetheless, although Sellars' body was not wrapped in plastic sheeting, the youth's body was found bound hand and foot and buried in a manner similar to Corll's other known victims.

== Indictment ==
On August 13, 1973, a grand jury convened in Harris County to hear evidence against Henley and Brooks. The jury heard evidence from both Rhonda Williams and Timothy Kerley, who each testified to the events of August 7 and 8 leading to the shooting of Dean Corll, plus the testimony from various police officers who recited and discussed the signed confessions Henley and Brooks had given and described how both had led them to each of the burial sites. The jury also heard the testimony of a youth named William Ridinger, who had been abducted by Corll, Henley and Brooks in the summer of 1972 and who testified as to his torture and abuse at the hands of the trio before Corll agreed to release him.

After hearing over six hours of testimony, on August 14, Henley was indicted on three counts of murder and Brooks on one count. Bail for both was set at $100,000. By September 7, the number of murder indictments against Henley had risen to six, with Brooks ultimately indicted on four counts of murder. Henley was not charged with the death of Dean Corll, which prosecutors would rule on September 18 had been committed in self-defense.

On October 8, Henley and Brooks were brought to court to face a formal arraignment. Henley was charged with six counts of murder and Brooks with four counts. Both youths pleaded not guilty to the charges against them. A subsequent hearing to suppress Henley's August 9 written confession on the grounds Henley had not been informed of his legal rights or given the opportunity to see a lawyer beforehand saw Judge William Hatten rule his confession admissible at his upcoming trial.

== Trial and conviction ==
=== Henley ===
Henley was brought to trial before Judge Preston Dial in San Antonio on July 1, 1974, charged with the murders of six teenage boys whom he himself had lured to Corll's apartment between March 1972 and July 1973. (Note: The six victims Henley was brought to trial for were Frank Aguirre, Johnny Delome, William Lawrence, Homer Garcia, Charles Cobble, and Marty Jones.) Henley was defended by William Gray and Edwin Pegelow, with Carol Vance and Donald Lambright prosecuting the case. Henley formally entered a plea of not guilty to the charges on the opening date of his trial.

The State of Texas presented a total of 96 pieces of evidence throughout Henley's trial, including the written confession Henley had given on August 9, which was read to the court in which he admitted killing or assisting in the abduction and murder of several youths, including the six teenagers for whose murders he was on trial. Other pieces of evidence presented included the wooden box used to transport the victims' bodies to the various burial sites and the plywood body board upon which many victims had been restrained. Within the wooden box, investigators had found several strands of human hair which examiners had concluded came from Charles Cobble.

A total of 25 witnesses testified as to Henley's involvement in the abductions and murders on behalf of the prosecution, including Detective David Mack Mullican who had attended the Lamar Drive crime scene prior to the discovery of Corll's crimes and had spent three days in Henley's company prior to and following his August 9 confession. Mullican outlined Henley's admissions as to the differing methods of torture used by Corll on several victims, how one victim had been kept alive for three days simply because Corll had "liked" him, and how Henley had informed him that strangling an individual to death "was not as easy like they show on TV", adding: "When we killed Marty Jones, I had to get Dean to come and help me." When questioned further about the plywood board used to restrain the victims, Mullican testified that Henley had informed him that in order to restrain the youths he, Brooks, and Corll had "handcuffed (the victims) to the board and sometimes to a wall with their mouths taped so they couldn't make any noise". Mullican's testimony was accompanied by the introduction of evidence directly related to the murders by prosecuting District Attorney Carol Vance.

Following advice from his defense counsel, Henley did not take the stand to testify in his own defense. Although one of his attorneys, William Gray, did cross-examine a number of prosecution witnesses, the defense did not subpoena any witnesses to testify on behalf of their client. Gray also urged the jury to "judge [the] evidence as unemotionally as you can". On more than 300 occasions, Henley's attorneys raised objections to the testimony given or evidence presented against Henley. Almost all were overruled.

On July 15, 1974, both counsels presented their closing arguments to the jury: the prosecution seeking life imprisonment; the defense a verdict of not guilty. In his closing argument to the jury, District Attorney Carol Vance apologized for not being able to seek the death penalty, adding he considered Henley "a monster who should be removed from society" and describing the case as the "most extreme example of man's inhumanity to man I have ever seen."

Edwin Pegelow delivered the closing argument on behalf of the defense. Pegelow did not dispute the fact Henley, by his own willing admission, had assisted in the commission of the crimes, but emphasized he had brought the murder spree to an end by killing Corll, and had subsequently willingly divulged his knowledge of and participation in the crimes to authorities in addition to helping locate the victims' bodies, when he could have remained silent.

==== Conviction ====
On July 16, the jury retired to consider their verdict. After 92 minutes of deliberations they reached their conclusion: Henley was found guilty and sentenced to six consecutive 99-year terms of imprisonment. On July 25, Henley and his attorneys filed an appeal, contending that Henley had been denied an evidentiary hearing; that the jury had not been sequestered; that a motion to move the initial trial away from San Antonio had also been denied; and that the presence of news media in the courtroom had also prejudiced his trial.

Henley's conviction was overturned on appeal on December 20, 1978. He was tried before Judge Noah Kennedy in Corpus Christi in June 1979, with Henley again represented by defense attorneys William Gray and Edwin Pegelow. On June 27, Henley was again convicted of six murders and again sentenced to six life terms, although the terms were to run concurrently rather than consecutively.

Elmer Wayne Henley first became eligible for parole on July 8, 1980; on this occasion, and each successive parole hearing to date, he has been denied parole, and he has stated that he does not expect to be released from prison. He was most recently denied parole on November 7, 2025.

Henley is currently incarcerated in the Telford Unit in Bowie County.

=== Brooks ===
David Brooks was tried before Judge William Hatten in Houston on February 27, 1975, charged solely with the June 1973 murder of William Ray Lawrence. He chose to plead not guilty. Brooks was defended by Jim Skelton and Elaine Brady, with Assistant District Attorney Tommy Dunn and Donald Lambright prosecuting the case.

Brooks's defense attorneys argued that their client had not committed any murders, and attempted to portray Corll and, to a lesser degree, Henley as being the active participants in the actual killings. Assistant District Attorney Tommy Dunn dismissed the defense's contention outright, at one point telling the jury: "Was he an innocent bystander? This defendant was in on this killing, this murderous rampage, from the very beginning. He tells you he was a cheerleader if nothing else. That's what he was telling you about his presence. You know he was in on it."

In the state's closing argument, prosecutor Donald Lambright outlined the ordeal endured by Lawrence over the period of three days, stating: "What kind of hell do you think he went through for three days?" He then described the teenager's ultimate death as "a blessing" in that his murder put an end to Lawrence's suffering. Lambright also outlined the fact that, unlike Henley, Brooks had continued to financially profit from successive victims' deaths—receiving "gifts and gratuities" from Corll.

In a 40-minute closing argument, defense attorney Jim Skelton argued that nobody disputed the brutality of Lawrence's murder, and that although the state had proven Brooks to be an accessory to Lawrence's murder, the state had failed to produce any evidence his client had killed Lawrence or any of the other victims, stating: "The state has proven David Owen Brooks of being an accessory to murder; the state has not established a murder case ... They have proved accessory to murder—not murder."

Skelton also argued the state had failed to prove an actual motive for his client's participation in the Lawrence's death, and had based their entire case upon circumstantial evidence and urged the jurors "before you convict, you've got to find an act to punish".

==== Conviction ====
Brooks's trial lasted less than one week, although the jury deliberated for just 90 minutes before announcing they had reached a verdict: Brooks was convicted and sentenced to life imprisonment on March 4. He did appeal his sentence, contending that the signed confessions used against him were taken without his being informed of his legal rights and the erroneous application of certain legal arguments, but his appeal was dismissed in May 1979.

David Brooks died of COVID-19 related complications in a Galveston hospital at the age of 65 on May 28, 2020, having been admitted to this hospital on May 12 with respiratory symptoms consistent with COVID-19. At the time of his death, Brooks was incarcerated at the Allan B. Polunsky Unit in Polk County, Texas, having served forty-five years of a life sentence. He and Henley corresponded on only one occasion in the decades following their respective convictions, in which Brooks responded to a letter from Henley inviting continued correspondence. Neither maintained written contact, with Henley musing in 2011: "He wrote back—he typed his letter and didn't sign it—saying 'Let's stay in touch', but we never did. I mean, in the end, what were we going to say to each other? How we wished we had never met Dean?"

Henley in 1997

== Imprisonment ==
Shortly after his conviction, Henley began to suffer from post-traumatic stress disorder, which was not initially diagnosed. To compensate, throughout the 1970s and early 1980s, he occupied himself with prison jobs—frequently working from 5:30 a.m. until 10:30 p.m. He would occupy much of his time with prison jobs into middle age—stating in 2011: "I try to keep myself busy and I try not to sleep much ... I don't like dreaming about the old days." Henley gradually earned a reputation as a model inmate. He describes himself as a voracious reader, and avidly follows current events.

I know that people will always think that I'm evil, but I know it's not true. I know I'm not useless. I know I've become someone my mom would be proud of ... Do you realize I hadn't even got my driver's license, and there I was, out committing murders with Dean just because I wanted to please him?

— Henley, reflecting on his criminal past and public perceptions of him to journalist Skip Hollandsworth (2011).

In the decades following his conviction, Henley has granted numerous interviews, although he frequently refuses to discuss his criminal past in detail with members of the press or public. By the late 1990s, he had reconciled himself to the fact he will most likely never be released from prison, on one occasion explaining to author Katherine Ramsland: "When I sometimes think that I don't deserve to be locked up for my entire life, I can't help but wonder, how can I ask to be let out when [the victims] never got anything past that?" On one occasion in 1997, Henley stated: "Don't think I don't have my bad nights and think, 'God, if only I had it to do all over again', but I don't have that—I have today. I'm at a point where I can stand before God and say, 'Here I am' instead of hiding. Maybe this is where I'm supposed to be."

=== Artwork ===
In 1994, at the suggestion of a Louisiana art dealer, Henley undertook painting and craftwork as a hobby, in part as a means of generating income for himself and his mother. (Note: A state law introduced in 2001 would prohibit Texan inmates from profiting from sales of their artwork.) He has since devoted much of his free time to various forms of art, and several exhibitions of his artwork have since been held, with the first being at the Hyde Park Gallery in Neartown Houston in 1997. This exhibition drew outrage from some victims' relatives. In 1999, the city of Houston expressed interest in building a monument to victims of violent crime, which Henley said he would be willing to help pay for with part of the proceeds from a second art show.

In interviews, Henley has stated that he suffers from a severe color deficiency in his eyesight that makes it impossible for him to clearly distinguish between reds and greens. To compensate, any people Henley paints are in black and white while his other works are usually in color. Henley refuses to paint or draw any images of a violent or exploitative nature; many of his works depict serene imagery such as landscapes, buildings, flowers and surrealistic imagery. The majority of Henley's artwork is created using acrylics and graphite. He has also designed custom jewelry.

== Media ==
=== Film ===
- A film loosely inspired by the Houston Mass Murders, Freak Out, was released in 2003. The film was directed by Brad Jones, who also starred as Corll. This film largely focuses upon the last night of Corll's life, prior to Henley shooting him and contacting authorities.
- Production of a film directly based upon the Houston Mass Murders, In a Madman's World, finished in 2014. Directed by Josh Vargas, In a Madman's World is directly based upon Elmer Wayne Henley's life before, during, and immediately after his involvement with Dean Corll and David Brooks. Limited edition copies of the film were released in 2017.

=== Bibliography ===
- Christian, Kimberly (2015). Horror in the Heights: The True Story of The Houston Mass Murders. CreateSpace. ISBN 978-1-515-19072-1
- Gibson, Barbara (2023). Houston Mass Murders 1973: A True Crime Narrative. Independent. ISBN 979-8-882-66863-0.
- Gurwell, John K. (1974). Mass Murder in Houston. Cordovan Press.
- Hanna, David (1975). Harvest of Horror: Mass Murder in Houston. Belmont Tower.
- Jessel, David; Wilson, Colin (1991). "The Candy Man". Murder Casebook: Investigations into the Ultimate Crime. No. 102. Marshall Cavendish. ISBN 978-0-748-53511-8.
- Johns, Bill (2025). The Candy Man - Dean Corll and the Houston Mass Murders: A True Crime Investigation of America's Most Overlooked Serial Killer. Independent. ISBN 979-8-268-69909-8.
- Olsen, Jack (1974). The Man with the Candy: The Story of the Houston Mass Murders. Simon & Schuster. ISBN 978-0-7432-1283-0.
- Olsen, Lise (2025). The Scientist and the Serial Killer: The Search for Houston's Lost Boys. Random House Publishing Group. ISBN 978-0-593-59568-8.
- Ramsland, Katherine; Ullman, Tracy (2024). The Serial Killer's Apprentice: The True Story of How Houston's Deadliest Murderer Turned a Kid Into a Killing Machine. Penzler Publishers. ISBN 978-1-613-16495-2.
- Rosewood, Jack (2015). Dean Corll: The True Story of The Houston Mass Murders. CreateSpace Independent Publishing Platform CreateSpace. ISBN 978-1-517-48500-9.
- Williams, Paul (1994). "The Pied Piper". Real-Life Crimes. No. 130. Eaglemoss Publications Ltd. ISBN 978-1-858-75022-4.

=== Television ===
- A 1982 documentary, The Killing of America, features a section devoted to the Houston Mass Murders.
- FactualTV host a documentary focusing upon the murders committed by Corll and his accomplices. Forensic Anthropologist Dr. Sharon Derrick is among those interviewed for the documentary.
- Investigation Discovery has broadcast a documentary focusing upon the Houston Mass Murders within their documentary series, Most Evil. This documentary, titled Manipulators, features an interview with Henley conducted by a former forensic psychologist named Kris Mohandie.
- The crime thriller series Mindhunter has broadcast an episode mentioning the Houston Mass Murders. This episode was first broadcast on August 16, 2019.
- Houston-based news channel KPRC-TV has broadcast an episode focusing upon the Houston Mass Murders as part of their crime series The Evidence Room. Hosted by investigative reporter Robert Arnold, this 28-minute episode, titled The Candy Man's Henchmen, was first broadcast in February 2023.
- The Serial Killer's Apprentice. Commissioned by Investigation Discovery, this two-hour documentary was first broadcast on August 17, 2025, and contains audio recordings of Henley's interviews with forensic psychologist Katherine Ramsland.

=== Podcast ===
- The Clown and the Candyman (2020–2021). An eight-part podcast series narrated by Jacqueline Bynon, investigating the murders committed by Corll, Henley and Brooks in addition to serial killer John Wayne Gacy. This series explores their respective potential links to a nationwide sex trafficking network, and the ongoing efforts to identify their victims.

== See also ==
- Capital punishment in Texas
- Crime in Texas
- List of serial killers in the United States
- List of serial killers by number of victims
- Manipulation (psychology)
- Self-preservation
- Thrill killing

== Cited works and further reading ==
- Berry-Dee, Christopher (2009). Born Killers. John Blake Publishing. ISBN 978-1-84454-848-4.
- Blundell, Nigel (1998) [1997]. Encyclopedia of Serial Killers. PRC Publishing. pp. 50–51. ISBN 978-1-856-48328-5.
- Cawthorne, Nigel; Tibballs, Geoff (1993). Killers. Boxtree. pp. 408–412. ISBN 0-752-20850-0.
- Fido, Martin (1995). Chronicle of Twentieth Century Murder. Bracken Publishing. ISBN 978-1-858-91390-2.
- Foreman, Laura (1992). Serial Killers: True Crime. Time-Life Books. ISBN 978-0-783-50001-0.
- Franscell, Ron (2010). Crime Buff's Guide to Outlaw Texas. Guildford Press. ISBN 978-0-762-75965-1.
- Furio, Jennifer (2001). Team Killers: A Comparative Study of Collaborative Criminals. Algora Publishing. ISBN 978-0-875-86143-2.
- Hare, Robert D. (2011). Without Conscience: The Disturbing World of the Psychopaths Among Us. Guilford Publications. ISBN 978-1-606-23578-2.
- Jeffers, H. Paul (1992). Profiles in Evil: Chilling Case Histories from the Files of the FBI's Violent Crime Unit. Warner Publishing. ISBN 978-0-751-50778-2.
- Jessel, David; Waddell, Bill (1991). "The Candy Man". Murder Casebook: Investigations into the Ultimate Crime. No. 102. Marshall Cavendish. ISBN 978-0-748-53511-8.
- Keppel, Robert D.; Birnes, William J. (2003). The Psychology of Serial Killer Investigations: The Grisly Business Unit. Academic Press. p. 8. ISBN 978-0-124-04260-5.
- Lane, Brian; Gregg, Wilfred (1992). The Encyclopedia of Serial Killers. Headline Publishing. ISBN 978-0-747-23731-0.
- Levin, Jack; Wiest, Julie B. (2018). The Allure of Premeditated Murder: Why Some People Plan to Kill. Rowman & Littlefield Publishers. ISBN 978-1-538-10389-0.
- McDougal, Dennis (1991). Angel of Darkness: The True Story of Randy Kraft and the Most Heinous Murder Spree. Grand Central Publishing. ISBN 978-0-446-51538-2.
- Rahr, Larry (2016). A Cop for 43 Years. Page Publishing Incorporated. ISBN 978-1-684-09172-0.
- Vance, Michael; Lomax, John (2014). Murder and Mayhem in Houston: Historic Bayou City Crime. The History Press. ISBN 978-1-626-19521-9.
- Varhola, Michael O. (2011). Texas Confidential: Sex, Scandal, Murder, and Mayhem in the Lone Star State. Clerisy Press. ISBN 978-1-57860-458-6.
- Whittington-Egan, Richard; Whittington-Egan, Molly (1992). The Murder Almanac. Neil Wilson Publishing. p. 51. ISBN 1-897784-04-X.
- Wilson, Colin (2013). A Plague of Murder: The Rise and Rise of Serial Killing in the Modern Age. Robinson Publishing. ISBN 978-1-854-87249-4.
- Wilson, Colin (2014). Manhunters: Criminal Profilers and Their Search for the World's Most Wanted Serial Killers. Skyhorse Publishing. ISBN 978-1-629-14293-7.
- Wynn, Douglas (1996). On Trial for Murder. Pan Books. pp. 69–72. ISBN 978-0-330-33947-6.
