= Rhonda Louise Williams =

American social worker (1957–2019)

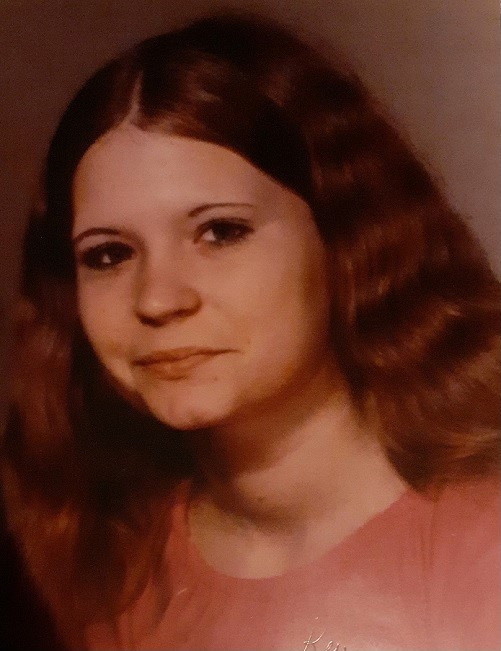
- Born: Rhonda Louise Williams; December 31, 1957; Houston, Texas, U.S.
- Died: September 16, 2019 (aged 61); Houston, Harris County, Texas, U.S.
- Other names: Rhonda Williams; Rhonda Griffin
- Occupations: Social worker; Advocator; Animal rescuer
- Years active: 1990–2019
- Children: 2

Rhonda Louise Pickett (born Rhonda Louise Williams; December 31, 1957 – September 16, 2019) was an American social worker and a key figure in the discovery of the Houston Mass Murders. As the sole female survivor of serial killer Dean Corll, her presence at Corll's residence on August 8, 1973, served as the catalyst that ended Corll's three-year murder spree.

== Early life ==
Rhonda Louise Williams was born in Houston, Texas, the youngest child of Benjamin Finis Williams and Catherine Fern Smith Williams. Her early childhood was marked by severe instability; she spent years in foster care and state homes and reported suffering from significant abuse within her family. She had three older siblings: a brother, Joseph Raymond "Joe Ray" Grabus, and two sisters, Judith Katherine "Judy" Williams Basar and Lynn (Williams) Pearson.

In 1972, Williams was engaged to 18-year-old Frank Anthony Aguirre, who disappeared in March of that year. Unbeknownst to her at the time, Aguirre had been lured to Corll's home and killed by Corll with the assistance of Elmer Wayne Henley—a boy who subsequently became Williams' close friend and boyfriend.

== The Houston Mass Murders (1973) ==
On the night of August 7, 1973, Williams was "lured" to Dean Corll's home in Pasadena by her friend, Elmer Wayne Henley, following a domestic dispute with her father. Upon arrival, she was rendered unconscious from paint-sniffing and drinking.

Williams woke up bound to a "torture board". Corll, who primarily targeted boys, was reportedly enraged that a girl had been brought to his house, stating it "ruined everything". Corll ordered Henley to torture and kill Williams and Kerley. Williams pleaded with Henley, later stating she gave him the courage to turn on Corll. Henley subsequently shot and killed Corll with a .22 caliber pistol, ending the three-year spree that claimed at least 28 victims.

== Career ==
=== Later life ===
In the aftermath of the trial, Williams faced significant social and familial isolation. A judge reportedly ordered her to never speak of the events, and she was moved to a different school under the name Rhonda Griffin. Despite lifelong struggle with multi-layered PTSD, she dedicated her life to service. She worked as a social worker, specifically advocating for abused and neglected children. She was a known caregiver for the elderly and a passionate animal rescuer within her community. (Note: According to her son Ryan Pickett that his mother Rhonda was a social worker for abused and neglected children, she rescue starving hurt animals, as well as a free loving caregiver to the elder in her community.)

=== Advocator ===
After 40 years of silence, Williams shared her story in a 2013 interview with ABC13 Houston, revealing she had remained in contact with Henley in prison as part of her recovery.

== Personal life ==
She eventually married and took the name Rhonda Louise Pickett. She had two sons, one of whom predeceased her as an infant (SIDS). She was also a dedicated animal rescuer in her community.

== Death ==
Pickett died in her sleep of natural causes on September 16, 2019, in Houston. In accordance with her final wishes, she was cremated, and her ashes were given to her surviving son, Ryan Pickett.

== Legacy ==
She is remembered as an inspiration for her resilience and her transition from a survivor of tragedy to a protector of the vulnerable.

== General and cited sources ==
- Olsen, Jack (1974). The Man with the Candy: The Story of the Houston Mass Murders. Simon & Schuster. ISBN 978-0-7432-1283-0.
- Foreman, Laura (1992). Serial Killers: True Crime. Time-Life Books. ISBN 978-0-783-50001-0.
- Rosewood, Jack (2015). Dean Corll: The True Story of The Houston Mass Murders. CreateSpace. ISBN 978-1-517-48500-9.
- Gibson, Barbara (2023). Houston Mass Murders 1973: A True Crime Narrative. Independent. ISBN 979-8-882-66863-0.
- Hanna, David (1975). Harvest of Horror: Mass Murder in Houston. Belmont Tower.
