= Barry Telford Unit =

State prison in Bowie County, Texas, U.S.

Barry B. Telford Unit
- Location in Texas
- Location: 3899 State Hwy 98 New Boston, Texas 75570; 33.4214167°N 094.4764833°W
- Status: Operational
- Security class: Security classification of the Texas Department of Criminal Justice|G1-G5, Administrative segregation, safekeeping.
- Capacity: 2,872
- Opened: July 1995
- Managed by: TDCJ Correctional Institutions Division
- Warden: Balden Polk
- Website: www.tdcj.state.tx.us/unit_directory/to.html

The Barry B. Telford Unit (TO) a.k.a. Telford Unit (opened July 1995) is a Texas state prison located in unincorporated Bowie County, Texas. The facility, along Texas State Highway 98, is 2 miles (3.2 km) south of Interstate 30. It has a "New Boston, Texas" mailing address, and is in proximity to Texarkana. The Telford Unit is operated by Texas Department of Criminal Justice Correctional Institutions Division, administered within Region II.

== History ==
On July 11, 1997, William Speer (then TDCJ#668485), killed a 47-year-old prisoner in his cell. Speer was sentenced to death and became TDCJ#999398. He is now in the Polunsky Unit. His co-defendant Anibal Canales was also sentenced to death.

On April 1, 1999, a prisoner named Lee Andrew Taylor, nicknamed "Tiny", fatally stabbed prisoner, Donta Green, in a dayroom. Taylor was a member of the Aryan Brotherhood of Texas, a prison gang ("security threat group" in TDCJ parlance) and the death was a result of racial tension. Taylor (TDCJ #765153 as a non-death row inmate) was serving a life sentence for aggravated robbery; The prisoner stated that the stabbing was self-defense. However Taylor was sentenced to death, and moved to the Polunsky Unit. He (TDCJ #999344 as a death row inmate) was executed at the Huntsville Unit on June 16, 2011.

On July 15, 2015, Officer Timothy Davison was beaten to death by an inmate he was escorting back to his cell. The inmate managed to free his hand from his handcuffs and grabbed the officer's slot pry tool and beat him in the head with it. The accused inmate, Billy Joel Tracy, 38, who has a history of violent behavior, was sentenced to death in November 2017 for the crime.

== Notable inmates ==
Inmate Name	Register Number	Status	Details
Elmer Wayne Henley	01924387 / 00241618	Serving six life terms without the possibility of parole.	Assisted with Dean Corll's murders from 1972–1973.

- Bernie Tiede
