= David Hanna (entertainment journalist) =

American journalist

- Born: September 11, 1917; Philadelphia, U.S.
- Died: June 21, 1993 (aged 75); New York City, U.S.
- Occupations: Author, journalist

David Hanna (September 11, 1917 – June 21, 1993) was an American author, entertainment journalist, and publicist.

He was noted for his biographies of celebrities such as Ava Gardner (for whom he acted as publicist during the 1950s), Elvis, John Wayne, and Robert Redford.

Born in Philadelphia but raised in New York, he lived and worked in Hollywood from 1935 to 1952, after which he returned to New York. In the 1940s he created the CBS radio series Tapestries of Life. He served as an assistant managing editor at The Hollywood Reporter and a columnist and drama critic for the Los Angeles Daily News. He was a publicist on such films as Moulin Rouge, War and Peace, and The Man Who Knew Too Much. He also contributed to Film Bulletin, The New York Times, Cosmopolitan, and London Express.

Hanna also wrote novels and true crime non-fiction. He occasionally used the pseudonyms Gloria Laine and Antony James.

He died of cancer on June 21, 1993, at St. Luke's-Roosevelt Hospital in New York City, aged 75.

== Partial bibliography ==
- Ava: A Portrait of a Star (1960)
- Robert Redford: The Superstar Nobody Knows (1975)
- The World of Jacqueline Susann (1975)
- Come Up and See Me Sometime: An Uncensored Biography of Mae West (1976)
- Bogart: A Confidential Biography (1976) ISBN 978-0685625866
- Elvis: Lonely Star at the Top (1977) ISBN 978-0843905328
- The Life and Times of John Wayne (1979) ISBN 978-0600394990
- James Dean: His Tragedy, His Life, His Films (1988) ISBN 978-0931064944
- Sinatra: Ol' Blue Eyes Remembered (1990) ISBN 978-0517160688
