= List of serial killers by number of victims =

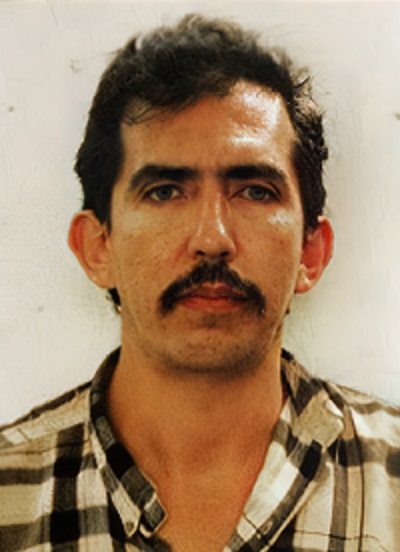
Luis Garavito is the serial killer with the highest known victim count at 193

A serial killer is typically a person who murders three or more people, in two or more separate events over a period of time, for primarily psychological reasons. There are gaps of time between the killings, which may range from a few days to months, or many years.

This list shows all known serial killers from the 20th century to present day by number of victims, then possible victims, then date. For those from previous centuries, see List of serial killers before 1900. In many cases, the exact number of victims assigned to a serial killer is not known, and even if that person is convicted of some, there can be the possibility that they killed many more.

Organization and ranking of serial killings is made difficult by the complex nature of serial killers and incomplete knowledge of the full extent of many killers' crimes. To address this, multiple categories have been provided in order to more accurately describe the nature of certain serial murders. This is not a reflection of an individual's overall rank, which may or may not vary depending on personal opinion concerning the nature and circumstances of their crimes. The fourth column in the table states the number of victims definitely assigned to that particular serial killer, and thus the table is in order of that figure. The fifth column states the number of possible victims the killer could have murdered. Some of these crimes are unsolved, but are included because they are the work of a serial killer, despite nobody being caught.

This list does not include mass murderers, spree killers, war criminals, members of democidal governments, or major political figures.

== Serial killers with the highest known victim count ==
The list below is a compilation of modern serial killers who currently have the highest verifiable murder count. It excludes medical professionals and pseudo-medical professionals with their ability to kill simply and in plain sight, and serial killer groups and couples. Murderers falling into these two categories are listed separately further down.

Name	Country	Years active	Proven victims	Possible victims	Notes
Luis Garavito	Colombia; Ecuador; Venezuela	1992–1999	193	194–300+	Child-murderer, torture-killer, and rapist known as "La Bestia" ("The Beast"). Garavito confessed to killing 140 boys between six and sixteen years old, from October 1992 to April 1999 in Colombia and neighboring countries. He is suspected of murdering as many as 300 victims, mostly street children. Garavito was originally sentenced to 1,853 years in prison, but this was later reduced to 22 years, after he led police to many of the bodies of his victims. He was scheduled to become eligible for parole in 2023. He died on 12 October 2023.
Mariam Soulakiotis	Greece	1939–1951	177	177+	Known as "Mother Rasputin"; abbess believed to have murdered wealthy women and children who came into her abbey. The true number of her victims is a matter of debate, but she was found guilty of 177 murders—150 through negligence (fraudulently claiming to offer free tuberculosis treatment when the 'treatment' only consisted of abiding in her high altitude convent) and 27 through starvation. Died in prison in 1954.
Pedro López	Colombia; Peru; Ecuador	1969–1980	110	300+	Child-murderer and rapist, known as "The Monster of the Andes". López targeted young girls, between the ages of eight and twelve. Arrested in 1980 and convicted in 1983 of killing three young girls, but claimed to have killed hundreds. Despite being believed to be one of the most prolific serial killers of the 20th century, he was released in the late 1990s.
Mikhail Popkov	Russia	1992–2010	83	86+	Serial rapist and killer nicknamed "The Werewolf", who was active for two decades in Angarsk, Irkutsk and Vladivostok. After being convicted of 22 murders in 2015, he confessed to an additional 59 murders, of which he was convicted of 56 in 2018. In July 2020, Popkov confessed to more killings, bringing the total number of admitted victims to 83. He was convicted of additional two killings in 2021 and another three in 2023. He was sentenced to life.
Daniel Camargo Barbosa	Colombia; Ecuador; Brazil (alleged)	1974–1986	72	180	Child and woman murderer, believed to have possibly raped and killed over 150 victims, primarily targeting female children, as they were more likely to be virgins. Confessed to killing 72 victims. He strangled young girls in Colombia and was arrested, but he escaped from prison, and started killing in Ecuador. He was rearrested in 1986, and was allegedly incarcerated in the same Ecuadorian prison as serial killer Pedro López. Camargo was killed in jail by the nephew of one of his victims.
Pedro Rodrigues Filho	Brazil	1967–2003	71	100+	Rodrigues Filho claimed to have killed over 100 victims, 47 of them inmates. He killed his first two victims at the age of 14. He was first arrested in 1973; he was convicted and sentenced to 128 years, but the maximum one can serve in Brazil is 30 years. He was released in 2018. He was murdered by two men in 2023.
Kampatimar Shankariya	India	1977–1978	70	70+	Shankariya was an Indian serial killer who used a hammer to kill over 70 men and women between 1978 and 1979. He was hanged in 1979; his last words were, "I have murdered in vain. Nobody should become like me."
Hoshang Amini	Iran	1954–1962	67	67	Known as the "Ghost of the Qanat Wells". Murdered 67 people, mostly young boys, in the city of Varamin from 1954 to 1962, sometimes aided by accomplices. He earned his nickname by decapitating his victims post-mortem and then dumping their bodies into wells.
Yang Xinhai	China	2000–2003	67	67	Known as the "Monster Killer". Yang would enter victims' homes at night and kill using axes, meat cleavers, hammers, and shovels. He was executed by gunshot in 2004.
Abul Djabar	Afghanistan	1970 and earlier	65	300+	Killed 65 men and boys by strangling them with turbans while raping them. Suspected of over 300 murders. Sentenced to death and hanged on 21 October 1970.
Samuel Little	United States	1970–2005	60	93	Little was convicted of killing three women, but later investigations linked 31 other murders to him. He claimed he killed as many as 93 victims total, three above his initial confession of 90; the FBI later confirmed a total of 60 murders linked to Little. The investigations into his crimes are ongoing. Sentenced to life imprisonment without the possibility of parole on 25 September 2014. Died in prison on 30 December 2020, aged 80.
William Unek	Belgian Congo; Tanganyika	1954–1957	58	58	William murdered 22 people with a machete before fleeing the territory. Three years later, William, armed with rifle and axe, murdered 36 more people in the village of Malampaka before being fatally shot by police during a manhunt.
Mohammed Bijeh	Iran	2002–2004	54	54	Bijeh raped and killed at least 54 male children and teenagers. On 27 November 2004, he was sentenced to be executed. Bijeh said that if he was not arrested, he would kill 100 children. He was executed after being lashed in front of a crowd in 2005.
Andrei Chikatilo	USSR	1978–1990	53	56	Known as "The Butcher of Rostov", "The Red Ripper" or "The Rostov Ripper". Chikatilo was convicted of the murder of 53 women and children between 1978 and 1990. One man was previously convicted and executed for his first murder. Chikatilo was executed by gunshot in 1994.
Anatoly Onoprienko	Soviet Union; Ukraine	1989–1996	52	52+	Known as "The Beast of Ukraine", "The Terminator", and "Citizen O". Onoprienko was convicted of the murders of nine people in 1989, and 43 people in 1995–1996. He travelled throughout Europe illegally from 1990 to 1995; whether he killed during this time is unknown. He was sentenced to death, and was later commuted to imprisonment for life. He died from heart failure in 2013.
Florisvaldo de Oliveira	Brazil	1982–1983	50	50+	Known as "Cabo Bruno"; de Oliveira was a former police officer and vigilante who murdered people in the outskirts of São Paulo. He was murdered by unknown assailants in 2012.
Gary Ridgway	United States	1982–1998	49	71–90+	Ridgway was a truck painter who confessed to killing 71 women. He was also known as the "Green River Killer". He almost exclusively targeted sex workers from Seattle. Ridgway was suspected of killing over 90 victims; he confessed to 71, and was convicted of 49. He was sentenced to life without parole.
Alexander Pichushkin	Russia	1992–2006	49	60	Pichushkin was also known as the "Chessboard Killer". He was convicted of murdering 49 victims, and suspected of killing 60. He claimed to have murdered 62 people, because he did not know that two of his victims had survived; he stated that his goal was becoming Russia's most prolific serial killer. He was sentenced to life imprisonment.
Wang Qiang	China	1995–2003	45	60+	Wang killed 45 and raped 10 from 1995 to 2003. He was executed by firing squad in 2005.
Ahmad Suradji	Indonesia	1986–1997	42	42	Suradji was convicted of strangling at least 42 women and girls in a series of ritual slayings he believed would give him magical powers. He was executed by firing squad in 2008.
Raman Raghav	India	1965–1968	41	41	In the late 1960s, Raghav went on a violent rampage in Mumbai, India. He bludgeoned 41 people to death inside their shelters while they slept. He died of kidney failure in 1995.
Moses Sithole	South Africa	1994–1995	38	76	Known as South Africa's Ted Bundy. Sithole preyed on unemployed women, posing as a businessman and luring his victims with the prospects of a job, before leading them to an isolated place, where he raped, tortured, and murdered them. He was sentenced to 2,410 years' imprisonment, with a non-parole period of 930 years.
Serhiy Tkach	USSR; Ukraine	1984–2005	37	100+	A former Ukrainian police criminal investigator, Tkach suffocated girls aged between eight and eighteen, and performed sexual acts on their bodies after they were dead. He claimed to have killed 100. He was sentenced to life imprisonment, and died from heart failure in 2018.
Gennady Mikhasevich	USSR	1971–1985	36	43–55+	Mikhasevich killed women by strangling them. Besides killing, he also robbed his victims of money and valuable items (that he would sometimes give to his wife as a gift). He was executed by firing squad in 1987.
Hadj Mohammed Mesfewi	Morocco	1906 and earlier	36	36+	Known as "Marrakesh Arch-Killer"; Mesfewi drugged, mutilated and murdered women; he was executed by immurement (walling) in 1906.
Vera Renczi	Kingdom of Romania; Yugoslavia; Hungary (alleged)	1920–1930	35	~35	Romanian serial killer nicknamed "The Black Widow". Renczi was convicted of killing 35 men through arsenic poisoning, but confessed to only killing 32 victims. Renczi is one of the world's most prolific female serial killers. However, there is very little information about Renczi and her crimes, because personal information (criminal history, academic records, etc.) were not cataloged as well as they are today, making some criminologists believe she was a figure of Romanian folklore, rather than an actual person.
Fernando Hernández Leyva	Mexico	1982–1999	33	137	Hernández Leyva confessed to 100 murders and six kidnappings at the time of his arrest in 1999 (he had been arrested previously in 1982 and 1986, the second time for murder, but escaped from prison), but later retracted, and claimed that he had been beaten by the police and his family threatened in order to force him to confess. He was accused of as many as 137 murders in five southern Mexican states, was convicted of 33 murders, and was sentenced to 50 years in prison. He tried unsuccessfully to commit suicide in prison. If his claim of 100+ victims were true, then Leyva would be Mexico's most prolific documented serial killer.
Toregeldy Zharambaev	Soviet Union; Kazakhstan	1990–1992	33	50+	Tortured and murdered a minimum of 33 people around his hometown of Shymkent, without any set preference for his victims. He would often strike them from behind with a blunt object and then either bludgeon or stab them to death, after which he masturbated on the corpses or inserted objects into the male victims' anuses. Executed in 1993 by a single gunshot wound to the back of the head.
John Wayne Gacy	United States	1972–1978	33	34–45+	Gacy is known to have murdered a minimum of 33 teenage boys and young men between 1972 and 1978, 26 of whom he buried in the crawl space of his Chicago home. He was known as the "Killer Clown", because he often entertained children at social events dressed in a self-devised clown costume. Executed by lethal injection in 1994.
Ali Asghar Borujerdi	Ottoman Empire; Iraq; Iran	1907–1934	33	33	Known as "Asghar the Murderer". Borujerdi killed 33 young adults in Iraq and Iran. He was executed by hanging in 1934.
Vasili Komaroff	Soviet Union	1921–1923	33	33	Known as "The Wolf of Moscow"; Komaroff was a horse trader who killed 33 men. He was executed by firing squad in 1923.
Radik Tagirov	Russia	2011–2012	31	31	Known as the "Volga Maniac". He murdered elderly women in several Russian regions.

== Serial killers with 15 to 30 proven victims ==
This part of the list contains all serial killers with 15 to 30 proven victims who acted alone and were neither medical professionals nor contract killers.

Name	Country	Years active	Proven victims	Possible victims	Notes
Karl Denke	Germany	1900–1924	30	42+	Killed and cannibalized poor travelers and homeless vagrants. Kept a ledger recording his murders with at least 31 names in it (including Vincenz Olivier, his only surviving victim), thus confirming at least 30 victims. But due to the massive amount of human remains found in his apartment, his kill count is suspected by many to exceed 42 victims. Killed himself by hanging in his holding cell before he could be tried.
Francisco das Chagas Rodrigues de Brito	Brazil	1989–2003	30	42	Serial killer of children, who also sexually abused and mutilated children in Maranhão and Pará; sentenced to 217 years' imprisonment.
Monster of the Mangones	Colombia	1963–1970s	30	38	Unidentified serial killer(s) who kidnapped, tortured, raped, and murdered at least 30 boys in Cali, Colombia.
Milton Sipalo	Zambia	1980	30	31	Known as "The Lusaka Strangler"; a soldier who raped and murdered women and girls in Lusaka. While awaiting trial, he jumped off of the roof of the police station where he was being interrogated, killing himself.
Luis Gregorio Ramírez Maestre	Colombia	2010–2012	30	30	Killed motorists in various municipalities before his 2012 capture. Was sentenced to 34 years in prison.
David Thabo Simelane	Swaziland	2000–2001	28	45	Sexually assaulted women he befriended in forests, stabbing or strangling them afterward; sentenced to death.
Cedric Maake	South Africa	1996–1997	27	35+	Known as the "Wemmer Pan Killer" and "Hammer Killer". He killed his victims with different instruments such as guns, rocks, a knife, and a hammer. Authorities attributed the murders to two serial killers because of the inconsistent modus operandi. In some cases he killed his victims with a rock, in others he shot them, and in others he murdered tailors with a hammer. Maake was arrested after Moses Sithole was found guilty of 38 killings and sentenced to 1,340 years in prison.
Carl Großmann	Germany	1918–1921	26	100+	Known as "The Berlin Butcher". Killed women and allegedly sold their flesh on the black market. Hanged himself in his cell after being sentenced to death.
Robert Pickton	Canada	1983–2002	26	49	Known as the "Pig Farmer Killer" or the "Butcher", he killed women mostly from the Vancouver Downtown Eastside and would feed the remains to the pigs on his farm. In 2007, he was initially convicted for the deaths of six women but was later found guilty of the deaths of 20 other women in 2010; however, he confessed to 49 killings to an undercover police officer. In 2024, Pickton died of injuries received in an attack from another inmate.
Oesin Bestari	Indonesia	1961–1964	25	25+	A goat leather trader, he killed fellow merchants whom he met at the market. His execution on 14 September 1978 was the first civil execution in post-independence Indonesia.
Juan Corona	United States	1971	25	25+	Corona was convicted of murdering ranch laborers and burying them in orchards. He was sentenced to 25 terms life imprisonment. Died from natural causes in 2019.
The Stoneman	India	1985–1989	25	25+	Twelve homeless people were murdered in their sleep in Bombay between 1985 and 1987, and 13 in Calcutta in 1989—in all cases, by dropping a large rock over their head (an additional victim escaped, but could not identify the attacker). No one was ever charged with any of the murders.
Fritz Haarmann	Germany	1918–1924	24	27+	Known as the Butcher of Hanover and the Vampire of Hanover because of his preferred method of killing by biting through his victim's throat, sometimes while sodomizing them. He would then dump the bodies in the nearby river Leine. Believed to have been responsible for the murder of 27 boys and young men, he was convicted, found guilty of 24 murders and executed by guillotine in 1925.
Béla Kiss	Austria-Hungary	1912–1916	24	24+	Evaded arrest and conviction after the discovery of 24 bodies hidden in large metal drums on his property in 1916. At that time he was serving in the Austro-Hungarian Army, and deserted when the military was notified of the murders by civilian authorities. His final whereabouts and fate are unknown, as is his final victim count.
Majid Salek Mohammadi	Iran	1981–1985	24	24	Killed mainly women he considered unfaithful to their husbands, and sometimes the children accompanying them. Killed himself before he could be sentenced.
Yvan Keller	France; Germany (suspected); Switzerland (suspected)	1989–2006	23	150	Known as the "Pillow Killer"; killed and robbed elderly women in France's Alsace region, but also confessed to up to 150 murders, including in Germany and Switzerland. Killed himself before trial.
Ronald Dominique	United States	1997–2006	23	23+	Louisianian serial killer, known locally as the Bayou Strangler and murdered victims in the Terrebonne Parish, Lafourche Parish, Iberville Parish and Jefferson Parish. Sentenced to eight life terms.
Juan Fernando Hermosa	Ecuador	1991–1992	23	23	Known as "Niño del Terror"; youth gang leader who murdered mostly taxi drivers and homosexuals in Quito. Murdered on his 20th birthday by unknown assailants.
Gerald Stano	United States	1969–1980	22	88	Confessed to killing 41 women, mostly in Florida and New Jersey. He was only convicted in 22 cases, and is suspected in the deaths of up to 88 victims. Some people have suggested that Stano was a serial confessor.
Earle Nelson	United States; Canada	1926–1927	22	25	Necrophiliac who primarily targeted boarding house landladies on the US West Coast during 1926; he was also known as "Gorilla Killer" or "the Dark Strangler". Captured after two murders in a small (now ghost) town in southern Manitoba. Found guilty, hanged by Canadian authorities in January 1928.
Mikhail Novosyolov	Soviet Union; Russia; Tajikistan	1977–1995	22	22	Known as the "Necrophile Rebel"; killed his victims with blows from heavy objects, then had sexual intercourse with their corpses. Sentenced to civil commitment.
Manuel Octavio Bermúdez	Colombia	1999–2003	21	50+	Colombian child rapist and serial killer. Known as "El Monstruo de los Cañaduzales" (The Monster of the Cane Fields). He confessed to killing 21 children in remote areas of Colombia. Sentenced to 40 years in prison.
Patrick Kearney	United States	1965–1977	21	43+	Would pick up young male hitch-hikers or young men from gay bars near Redondo Beach, California, and kill them. Sentenced to imprisonment for life.
Vasile Tcaciuc	Romania	1917–1935	21	26+	Romanian man who lured victims and then murdered them with an axe. He was arrested in 1935 after a dog found a dead body in his house. He confessed to having committed at least 26 murders. He was shot dead by a policeman while trying to escape from prison.
Larry Eyler	United States	1982–1984	21	23+	Known as "The Interstate Killer", he was sentenced to death for the 1984 murder and dismemberment of 15-year-old Daniel Bridges. He confessed to other homicides of young men and boys in five separate states. Died of AIDS complications in 1994.
Francisco Guerrero Pérez	Mexico	1880–1908	21	21	Known as "El Chalequero", he was the first captured serial killer in Mexico and killed sex workers in Mexico City. Died in 1910 from cerebral thromboembolism and another, unspecified cause.
Ted Bundy	United States	1974–1978 (Note: Although his confirmed killing spree began in 1974, Bundy later implied to forensic psychologists that his active years began earlier than it.)	20	35–100+	Bundy was an American serial killer known for his charisma and good looks. He officially confessed to 30 homicides, but had confessed to killing 35–36 women in the past, and some estimates run upwards of 100 or more. He was infamous for escaping from prison twice and murdering multiple victims in one day; sometimes abducting women from the same location within hours of one another. He was executed by electric chair in 1989.
Yoo Young-chul	South Korea	2003–2004	20	26	Used a hammer to murder mostly older victims, until his focus shifted to the decapitation and mutilation of escorts after being dumped by a girlfriend who worked in that profession. Sentenced to death and is currently incarcerated.
Abdullah Shah	Afghanistan	1990s	20	20+	Killed travelers on the road from Kabul to Jalalabad serving under Zardad Khan. Also killed his wife. Executed on 20 April 2004.
Mohan Kumar	India	2005–2009	20	20	Lured female victims with promises of marriage and gave them cyanide, claiming they were contraceptive pills, Sentenced to death in 2013.
Bulelani Mabhayi	South Africa	2007–2012	20	20	Known as the "Monster of Thuleni"; killed 20 women and children from 2007 to 2012. Sentenced to 25 life sentences on 3 September 2013.
Cape Town Prostitute Killer	South Africa	1992–1996	19	20	Unidentified serial killer who, on rainy nights, picked up sex workers and domestic workers in his vehicle, strangled them in parking lots, and dumped their bodies in rural, preselected spots.
"El Psicópata"	Costa Rica	1986–1996	19	19+	Known as "The Psychopath", an unidentified serial killer who killed 19 people with an M3 submachine gun in three Costa Rican towns, always south of the Florencio del Castillo Highway.
Sergei Ryakhovsky	Soviet Union; Russia	1988–1993	19	19+	Known as the "Balashikha Ripper", he was convicted for the murders of at least 19 victims. Died from tuberculosis in 2005.
Yevgeny Chuplinsky	Russia	1998–2006	19	19+	Known as the "Novosibirsk Maniac"; killed sex workers in Novosibirsk. Despite extensive police search and the capture of another serial killer, he was only arrested in 2016. Sentenced to life imprisonment.
M. Jaishankar	India	2008–2011	19	19+	Accused of killing at least 19 women. Charged with 13 murders, he escaped during a trial transport. Killed eight more people in two months before he was recaptured. Sentenced to 27 years. Killed himself by slashing his wrists with a shaving blade in prison on 27 February 2018.
Vadim Ershov	Russia	1992–1995	19	19	Known as the "Krasnoyarsk Beast"; committed 70 crimes around the Krasnoyarsk area, including 19 murders and eight attempted murders. Sentenced to death, commuted to life imprisonment.
Velaphi Ndlangamandla	South Africa	1998	19	19	Known as "The Saloon Killer"; robber who murdered people around Mpumalanga in his crime spree. Sentenced to 137 years' imprisonment.
Valery Kopytov	Russia	2000–2004	19	19	Known as "The Barnaul Chikatilo"; homeless man who killed other homeless people in Altai Krai.
Randall Woodfield	United States	1979–1981	18	44	Known as "The I-5 Killer" and "The I-5 Bandit"; suspected of as many as 44 murders. Sentenced to imprisonment for life.
Yavuz Yapıcıoğlu	Turkey	1994–2002	18	40	Killed in various cities in Turkey; 18 murders proven and accused of more than 40 by eyewitnesses and relatives. Sentenced to 74 years in prison.
Paul John Knowles	United States	1974	18	35+	Known as the "Casanova Killer"; killed 18 people in various states in 1974. Claimed 35 murders. Shot dead by FBI agents.
Thierry Paulin	France	1984–1987	18	21	Known as "The monster of Montmartre"; killed and robbed elderly women. Died in prison of AIDS in 1989 before trial.
Richard Nyauza	South Africa	2002–2006	18	19	Known as "The Quarry Murderer"; bludgeoned, beat, strangled, and stabbed 16 women and two unborn children to death and left their bodies in or around a quarry. Given 16 life sentences.
Umesh Reddy	India	1996–2002	18	18+	Confessed to 18 rapes and murders. Sentenced to death. Sentence later commuted to 30 years to life imprisonment.
Christopher Mhlengwa Zikode	South Africa	1994–1995	18	18+	Known as "Donnybrook Serial Killer" murdered 18 people in Donnybrook, KwaZulu Natal from 1994 to 1995. Sentenced to 140 years imprisonment (five life sentences).
Kotakethana murders	Sri Lanka	2008–2015	18	18+	A middle-aged man was arrested in 2015 and his DNA matched with six of 18 murders of women in the Rathnapura district of Sri Lanka. Nine other cases remain unsolved.
Asande Baninzi	South Africa	2001	18	18	Killed 18 people in three months, including a family of four. Received 19 life sentences and 189 years of imprisonment.
Vladimir Mirgorod	Russia	2002–2004	18	18	Known as "The Strangler", raped and strangled women in Moscow, also killing the son of one of the victims. Sentenced to life imprisonment.
Richard Cottingham	United States	1967–1980	17	85–100	Killer operating in New York and New Jersey who often targeted sex workers and utilized mutilation as well as dismemberment in his killings. Known as the "Torso Killer", with 17 confirmed homicide victims including nine convictions and a further eight official confessions. He has made unsubstantiated claims of up to a hundred victims.
Huang Yong	China	2001–2003	17	25	Lured and murdered 17 teenage boys, although he is suspected of 25 murders between September 2001 and 2003. Executed by firing squad in 2003.
Pedro Pablo Nakada Ludeña	Peru	2005–2006	17	25	Known as "El Apóstol de la Muerte" ("The Apostle of Death"). Convicted of 17 murders and claimed 25. Sentenced to 35 years in prison.
Darbara Singh	India	2004	17	23	Sexually assaulted and then murdered children of non-Punjabi immigrants. Died in 2018 from an illness while serving a life sentence.
Robert Hansen	United States	1971–1983	17	21	Sex workers he kidnapped were released into the Alaskan wilderness for him to hunt down like animals. Based on discovered remains, police suspect him of six murders in addition to the 17 for which he was convicted. Sentenced to 461 years plus life. Died from unspecified health problems in 2014.
Sergei Dovzhenko	Ukraine	1992–2002	17	19	Killed people because they were "mocking" him. Sentenced to life imprisonment.
Jeffrey Dahmer	United States	1978–1991	17	17	One of the most notorious serial killers from the United States, also known as the "Milwaukee Cannibal" or the "Milwaukee Monster". Dahmer was a serial killer and sex offender who killed and dismembered 17 men and boys between 1978 and 1991. He was a necrophile who ate some of his victims and kept their body parts in his freezer. Sentenced to life imprisonment; murdered in prison in 1994.
Donato Bilancia	Italy	1997–1998	17	17	Burglar who murdered 17 people, mainly sex workers, between 1997 and 1998, during a six-month period. Known as the "Prostitutes Killer" and the "Liguria Monster". Sentenced to imprisonment for life, he died due to COVID-19 in 2020.
Irina Gaidamachuk	Russia	2002–2010	17	17	Known as "Satan in a skirt"; killed 17 elderly women between 2002 and 2010. Sentenced to 20 years in prison.
Chen Fuzhao	China	2003	17	17	Alleged Falun Gong fanatic who fatally poisoned 17 people in 2003.
Randy Steven Kraft	United States	1971–1983	16	67	Convicted of 16 counts of murder but left a cryptic "score card" referring to at least 65 victims. May have had an accomplice. Sentenced to death.
Juana Barraza	Mexico	Late 1990s–2006	16	49	Mexican female wrestler who bludgeoned or strangled elderly women to rob them. Sentenced to 759 years.
Sipho Agmatir Thwala	South Africa	1996–1997	16	19	Nicknamed the "Phoenix Strangler" after the area in which he committed his crimes, he raped and strangled 19 women. Found guilty of 16 murders and sentenced to life imprisonment.
Saeed Hanaei	Iran	2000–2001	16	19	Confessed to luring 16 sex workers to his home and killing them in an attempt to "cleanse" the city of Mashhad. His actions were dubbed "The Spider Murders". Executed by hanging in 2002.
Maina Ramulu	India	2003–2020	16	18	Convicted of murdering 16 women between 2003 and 2013 during three separate murder sprees. He was released from prison in 2020, and allegedly murdered two more women.
José Antonio Rodríguez Vega	Spain	1987–1988	16	16+	Nicknamed El Mataviejas (The Old Lady Killer), he raped and killed at least 16 elderly women, aged from 61 to 93 years old, in and around Santander, Cantabria. He went unrecognized for over a year because he moved his victims into their beds after they were killed; no autopsies were made and the deaths were attributed to natural causes. He also took trophies from his victims that he held in a particular room of his home; about 10 percent of these trophies remained unclaimed, implying the existence of other victims. He was stabbed to death by two inmates while incarcerated in 2002.
Carroll Cole	United States	1948–1980	16	16	Killed 16 people in California, Nevada, and Texas. Executed by lethal injection in 1985.
Elias Xitavhudzi	South Africa	1950s	16	16	Nicknamed Panga man for his use of a machete (locally known as a "panga"). He stabbed and robbed his victims between 1953 and 1959. Executed by hanging in 1960.
Charles Ray Hatcher	United States	1969–1982	16	16	A habitual criminal, confessed to the rape and murder of over 20 young and adolescent males. Escaped from prison several times and was declared a "manipulative institutionalized sociopath". Sentenced to life; killed himself by hanging himself in prison in 1984.
Yuri Ivanov	USSR	1974–1987	16	16	Known as the "Ust-Kamenogorsk Maniac"; Kazakhstani rapist who killed girls and women who spoke negatively of men, Executed 1987.
Robert Lee Yates	United States	1975–1998	16	16	Killed sex workers in the "Skid Row" area of E. Sprague Avenue in Spokane, Washington. Sentenced to 408 years in prison and two death sentences.
Farid Baghlani	Iran	2004–2008	16	16	Known as the "Cyclist killer"; murdered 15 women and one boy. Executed by hanging on 13 November 2010.
Jimmy Maketta	South Africa	2005	16	16	Pleaded guilty to and convicted of 16 murders and 19 rapes committed over the nine-month period of April to December 2005.
Jack Mogale	South Africa	2008–2009	16	16	Raped and strangled women in the Donnybrook area. On 17 February 2011, convicted of 16 murders and 19 rapes, nine kidnappings, robbery and assault.
Donald Henry Gaskins	United States	1953–1982	15	100+	Known as "The Meanest Man in America", Gaskins was convicted of nine murders committed in South Carolina between 1973 and 1975. He was suspected of 31 murders. Two victims had been murdered while Gaskins had been incarcerated—one while Gaskins had been on death row. Later claimed on death row that he had murdered between 100 and 110 victims. Executed by electric chair in 1991.
Ravinder Kumar	India	2008–2015	15	30+	Serial rapist who killed children of poor families.
Atlanta Ripper	United States	1911	15	21	Unidentified serial killer(s) who killed at least 15 Atlanta women in 1911, possibly as many as 21 in total.
Ángel Maturino Reséndiz	United States; Mexico	1986–1999	15	18	Known as the "Railroad Killer" because his killings were committed near the railroad tracks he used to traverse the country. He was charged with and/or confessed to 15 murders occurring from 1986 to 1999 in Texas, Florida, Illinois, Georgia, and Kentucky. He was also suspected in a 1997 California murder case and claimed two additional killings he refused to elaborate on. Executed by lethal injection in 2006.
Chester Turner	United States	1987–1998	15	15+	Convicted of killing 15 people in Los Angeles in the 1980s and 1990s. Sentenced to death.
Alexander Labutkin	USSR	1933–1935	15	15	Known as the "One-Armed Bandit"; killed people in the forest near the Prigorodny settlement using a revolver. Executed 1935.
Florencio Fernández	Argentina	1950s	15	15	Stalked his victims, then would beat and bite them while they were asleep. Died from natural causes a few years after his 1960 arrest.
Elifasi Msomi	South Africa	1953–1956	15	15	Killed his victims with an axe or a knife in the 1950s. Executed by hanging in 1956.
Maurizio Minghella	Italy	1978–2001	15	15	Killed five young women; imprisoned and released, after which he killed 10 more. Sentenced to life imprisonment.
Bai Baoshan	China	1983–1997	15	15	Killed 15 people while robbing several police stations. Executed by gunshot in 1998.
Lee Choon-jae	South Korea	1986–1994	15	15	Also known as the Hwaseong serial murders. Most of the victims were bound, gagged, and strangled with their own clothes. It sparked the largest criminal case in South Korea with two million officers mobilized and over 21,000 suspects investigated. A suspect was identified in 2019, but he could not be prosecuted due to the statute of limitations. He later confessed to killing 15 people, in addition to the murder of his sister-in-law.

== Serial killers with 5 to 14 proven victims ==
This part of the list contains all serial killers with five to fourteen proven victims who acted alone and were neither medical professionals nor contract killers.

Name	Country	Years active	Proven victims	Possible victims	Notes
Carl Eugene Watts	United States	1974–1982	14	100+	Believed to have killed over 80 women in multiple states, in 1982 Watts accepted a plea bargain in Texas in which he would plead guilty to a lesser charge and be granted immunity from murder charges in exchange for providing information on his victims; as a result he confessed to 12 murders and was sentenced to 60 years in prison on the lesser charge. He was sentenced to life imprisonment in separate trials in Michigan in 2004 and 2007, and died of cancer a week after the 2007 sentence was handed down. Watts is now suspected to have killed more than 100 women, which would make him the most prolific serial killer in American history.
Belle Gunness	United States	1884–1908	14	40	Norwegian-born murder-for-profit killer who murdered her suitors and relatives in Indiana. High possibility of committing over 40 murders. May have faked her own death in the fire that destroyed her home in 1908; her children had died of strychnine poisoning before the fire, and the woman's body found next to them was decapitated and, reportedly, smaller than Gunness' own. Ultimate fate unknown.
Philipp Tyurin	USSR	1945–1946	14	29	Known as the "Leningrad Maniac" and the "Hellraiser"; murdered people for monetary reasons at his hut in Leningrad; executed 1947.
Zdzisław Marchwicki	Poland	1964–1970	14	21+	Also known as Vampire of Zagłębie. Killed 14 women in 1964–1970 in Poland's region of Dąbrowa Basin. Zdzisław Marchwicki was most likely the man responsible for the killings; however, his guilt remains in dispute. Executed in 1977.
Julio Pérez Silva	Chile	1998–2001	14	19	Known as The Psychopath from Alto Hospicio; killed 14 women. Sentenced to life imprisonment in 2004.
Monster of Florence	Italy	1968–1985	14	16	Unidentified killer who shot couples in lovers lanes and mutilated the women, taking their sexual organs and in the last two cases, also their left breast. 69-year-old farmer Pietro Pacciani was controversially convicted of 14 crimes in 1994 and sentenced to life in prison, but he was released following allegations that the scant evidence had been planted in an attempt to close the case, which was by then the largest and most mediatic in Italy's criminal history. Pacciani was scheduled for retrial in 1998 when he died after taking medication contraindicated to his heart problems. Pacciani's two alleged accomplices, Mario Vanni and Giancarlo Lotti, were sentenced to life and 30 years in prison, respectively. Some believe that none of the accused were guilty, and that Lotti incriminated himself and the other two because he was homeless and wanted to live in prison.
Joachim Kroll	West Germany	1955–1976	14	14	Known as the "Ruhr Cannibal" and "The Duisburg Man-Eater"; died from a heart attack in prison in 1991.
Arthur Shawcross	United States	1972–1989	14	14	Committed arson and burglary, served two years of a five-year sentence. Within a year of his release, he raped and murdered two children in 1972. Under a plea bargain, he was sentenced to 25 years. Released after serving 14½ years, he began killing again a year later, targeting sex workers. Known as the "Genesee River Killer", "Genesee River Strangler", "Rochester Strangler", and "Monster of the Rivers", he strangled and battered his victims. Sentenced to life without parole. Died of cardiac arrest in 2008.
Naceur Damergi	Tunisia	1980–1988	14	14	Raped and killed minors in the Nabeul region; executed by hanging in 1990.
Muthukutty Chandran	India	1985–1986	14	14	Committed 14 robbery-murders between 1985 and 1986 in Kerala, executed by hanging on 6 July 1991.
Marcelo Costa de Andrade	Brazil	1991	14	14	Known as The Vampire of Niterói. Raped and killed 14 children in Rio de Janeiro and Niterói. Drank the blood of his victims. Found not guilty by reason of insanity.
Sergey Shipilov	Russia	1995–1999	14	14	Known as the "Velsk Chikatilo"; killed female hitchhikers in the town of Velsk, most of them while out on prison leave; sentenced to life imprisonment.
Dorángel Vargas	Venezuela	1997–1999	14	14	Homeless cannibal known as "The People Eater" (El Comegente) and "The Hannibal Lecter of the Andes". Murdered a homeless man and was institutionalized. After escaping the institution, he went on to kill 10 other men and was arrested. In 2016, he and several other inmates killed three others and Vargas served their remains to other inmates.
Hua Ruizhuo	China	1998–2001	14	14	Was responsible for the murders of 14 sex workers in Beijing's Chaoyang District.
Denis Pischikov	Russia	2002–2003	14	14	Known at the "Shivering Creature"; robbed and killed elderly people around the Moscow Oblast and Vladimir Oblast; sentenced to life imprisonment.
Abdufatto Zamanov	Russia	2002–2004	14	14	Killed people out of personal hostility; also raped two young girls; sentenced to life imprisonment.
Jeong Nam-gyu	South Korea	2004–2006	14	14	Kidnapped, raped and murdered people; killed himself.
Amir Qayyum	Pakistan	2005	14	14	Known as "The brick killer". Killed 14 homeless men with rocks or bricks when they were asleep. Sentenced to death in May 2006.
Denis Kazungu	Rwanda	2023	14	14	Murdered 14 people at his home in Kigali, arrested and pleaded guilty in September 2023.
Sararat Rangsiwuthaporn	Thailand	2015–2023	14	14	Sentenced to death in 2024 for poisoning 14 people with cyanide.
Jake Bird	United States	1930–1947	13	46	Sentenced to death for the murders of two people; confessed to 44 other murders; 11 were substantiated and he was suspected in the others. Executed by hanging in 1949.
Cleveland Torso Murderer	United States	1934–1938	13	40+	Unidentified serial killer, also known as "The Mad Butcher of Kingsbury Run", who targeted drifters and derelicts, of whom only two were identified, between 1934 and 1938 in Cleveland, Ohio.
Kaspars Petrovs	Latvia	2003	13	38+	Confessed to strangling 38 elderly residents of Riga, Latvia, in 2003. Convicted and sentenced to life imprisonment for the robbery and murder of 13.
Peter Sutcliffe	United Kingdom	1975–1980	13	33	Killed at least 13 women between 30 October 1975 and 17 November 1980. Most victims were killed by a combination of bludgeoning and stabbing, and all but two were killed in the county of Yorkshire. Owing to the modus operandi and location of the murders, Sutcliffe became known as the "Yorkshire Ripper". Sentenced to 20 concurrent life sentences. After three years he was sent to a secure psychiatric facility, where he served 25 years before being found "fit to leave" in 2009. Government officials and courts ruled in 2010 that he would never be released. In 2015, he was declared "no longer mentally ill", and transferred to a maximum security prison. After his 1981 conviction police investigated 60 unsolved murders and attempted murders across Britain they thought Sutcliffe could be responsible for, but were able to eliminate him from 40. He has since also been linked by several investigators to the murder of Carol Wilkinson, for which an innocent man spent many years in prison. Sutcliffe died in hospital on 13 November 2020 at age 74, after being diagnosed with COVID-19.
Fosaville Serial Killer	South Africa	1999–2003	13	26	Kidnapped, bound, and strangled at least 13 women in Fosaville, South Africa. He may also be responsible for the "Riverman" murders.
William Suff	United States	1986–1992	13	23	Previously served 10 years of a 70-year sentence for beating his baby daughter to death. Beginning two years after his release, this county store clerk raped, stabbed, strangled, and sometimes mutilated 12 or more sex workers in Riverside County, California. Known as the "Riverside Prostitute Killer" and the "Lake Elsinore Killer". Sentenced to death.
Richard Ramirez	United States	1984–1985	13	20	Killed 13 people between 28 June 1984, and 24 August 1985, in Los Angeles. Known as the "Night Stalker". Ramirez was sentenced to death in 1989, and died of B-cell lymphoma in 2013 while still on death row.
Sleepy Hollow Killer	South Africa	1990s–2007	13	16+	Raped and murdered women, mostly sex workers, around Pietermaritzburg and the Midlands of KwaZulu-Natal.
Francisco Antonio Laureana	Argentina	1974–1975	13	13+	Raped 15 women in San Isidro, killing 13 of them. Shot and killed during a firefight with police.
Joseph James DeAngelo	United States	1979–1986	13	13+	Known as the "Golden State Killer", "Original Night Stalker", and "East Area Rapist". A police officer who committed at least 13 murders, 50 rapes, and 120 burglaries across California in the 1970s and 1980s. He was identified and arrested in 2018 after DNA evidence confirmed his identity. In 2020, he pleaded guilty and was sentenced to life in prison without parole.
Tamara Samsonova	Russia	1995–2015	13	13+	Known as the "Granny Ripper"; killed and allegedly cannibalized people in her apartment; committed to a psychiatric clinic.
Boston Strangler	United States	1962–1964	13	13	Although Albert DeSalvo was widely thought to be the Boston Strangler, police and others analysing the case have long doubted the truth of his confession. Sentenced to life for a series of rapes, he was murdered in prison. DeSalvo's body was exhumed for DNA testing, and compared to a substance found on the exhumed body of the Boston Strangler's last victim. In 2001, it was declared not to match, but in 2013 officials announced that improvements in DNA extraction technology produced viable samples from the degraded evidence. DeSalvo's body was reexhumed and found to match.
Herbert Mullin	United States	1972–1973	13	13	Despite detailed confessions, prosecutors decided not to try him for the first three crimes, instead focusing on crimes that conflicted with his insanity plea. Sentenced to imprisonment for life.
Vladimir Storozhenko	USSR	1978–1981	13	13	Known as the "Smolensky Strangler"; tortured and murdered women for sexual pleasure; four other innocent men were initially convicted for his crimes; executed 1982.
Johannes Mashiane	South Africa	1982–1989	13	13	Known as "The Beast of Atteridgeville", he was found guilty of 13 counts of murder and 12 counts of sodomy from 1982 to 1989. Killed himself by throwing himself under a bus while being pursued by police in 1989.
Vasiliy Kulik	Soviet Union	1984–1986	13	13	Known as the Irkutsk Monster; killed at least 13 victims from 1984 to 1986. Executed by firing squad in 1989.
Nikolai Dudin	USSR; Russia	1987–2002	13	13	Known as the "Grim Maniac"; killed his father in 1987, and after release, killed 12 more people while intoxicated; sentenced to life imprisonment.
Mukosi Freddy Mulaudzi	South Africa	1990–2006	13	13	Known as "The Limpopo Serial Killer"; escaped convict, originally responsible for two murders, who murdered 11 more after his prison escape; given 11 life sentences.
Duan Guocheng	China	1999–2001	13	13	Nicknamed "The Red-dress killer" or "The Red-dress slasher" because his victims were lone women walking alone either wearing red-dresses or another type of red. He sparked panic among women in Central China, with public officials warning them to stop wearing red during the years which he was at large. Executed 4 April 2003.
Nikolay Shubin	Russia	2004–2006	13	13	Paranoid schizophrenic who killed people who beat him in chess games; sentenced to compulsory treatment.
Thozamile Taki	South Africa	2007	13	13	Known as the "Sugar cane serial killer", he murdered 13 women. Convicted in 2010.
"Rainbow Maniac"	Brazil	2007–2008	13	13	Unidentified serial killer who shot gay men in the head (except one, who was bludgeoned) in the Paturis Park of Carapicuiba.
Li Wenxiang	China	1991–1996	13		Known as "The Guangzhou Ripper". Killed 13 female sex workers in Guangzhou. Executed.
Adolf Seefeldt	German Empire; Germany; Germany	1908–1935	12	100	Known as the "Sandman"; sexually abused young boys in their sleep, then poisoned them; suspected of 100 murders in total. Executed by guillotine in 1936.
José Manuel Martínez	United States	1978–2013	12	36	Mexican-American self-confessed hitman who admitted to committing 36 murders in 12 different states, sometimes on the orders of his cartel bosses and sometimes out of personal animosity. Ultimately convicted or pleaded guilty to a total of 12 murders in three different states.
Charles Sobhraj	Thailand; Nepal; India; Malaysia	1975–1976	12	30	French con man known as "The Bikini Killer" or "The Serpent" that targeted Western tourists in vacation spots of South-east Asia, often with the help of female accomplices. Imprisoned in India from 1976 to 1997, and sentenced to life imprisonment in Nepal in 2004. He was released from prison in Nepal in 2022.
Bruce George Peter Lee	United Kingdom	1973–1979	12	26	Epileptic arsonist who killed people in the city of Hull; sentenced to life imprisonment, but was later institutionalized. Originally convicted of killing 26 people, but 14 of his convictions were overturned after evidence suggested that the fires which killed them may have been accidental.
Slamet Tohari	Indonesia	2020–2023	12	24+	Swindler who was convicted of 12 murders by cyanide poisoning committed in Central Java between 2020 and 2023. He confessed to "dozens" of murders. Sentenced to death in 2024.
Vladimir Romanov	USSR; Russia	1991–2005	12	20	Known as the "Kaliningrad Maniac"; a child rapist who murdered girls and young women in the Kaliningrad Oblast; killed himself while imprisoned.
Maury Travis	United States	2000–2002	12	17	Killed sex workers in the St. Louis area from 2000 to 2002. Caught when he mailed an Expedia.com map showing where to find a body to a St. Louis newspaper. Killed himself by hanging in prison.
Dennis Nilsen	United Kingdom	1978–1983	12	15–16	Picked up young men in London between 1978 and 1983 and dismembered them, keeping various body parts around his home. Died from surgical complications in 2018.
Kenneth Bianchi	United States	1977–1978	12	15	Convicted of strangling 12 female victims aged 12 to 28 and suspected in another three cases. One of the "Hillside Stranglers". Sentenced to imprisonment for life.
Enriqueta Martí	Spain	c. 1900–1912	12	12+	Self-proclaimed witch that abducted, prostituted, murdered and made potions with the bodies of small children that she sold in Barcelona. Remains of 12 different children were identified in her home, but she is believed to have murdered more. Murdered in prison by fellow inmates while awaiting trial in 1913. Recent investigations by writer Jordi Corominas and historian Elsa Plaza question the popular version of the black legend of Enriqueta Martí and warned about multiples misinformation, because Enriqueta "was never formally charged with murder nor was any corpse of a child found in her home".
Abdallah al-Hubal	Yemen	1990–1998	12	12	Killed seven people after Yemeni unification; fled prison, then proceeded to kill a young couple and three more people; killed during a shootout with police.
Nikolai Shestakov	USSR	1975	12	12	Known as the "Luberetsky Maniac"; truck driver who raped and killed girls and young women; supposedly executed in 1977.
Joseph Christopher	United States	1980–1981	12	12	Known as "The Midtown Slasher"; racist who killed 12 people, all but one of them African Americans, in 1980 and 1981, between upstate New York and Georgia, mutilating two of them. Sentenced to life imprisonment, died in prison age 33 of breast cancer.
"Paraquat murders" killer	Japan	1985	12	12	Unidentified serial killer who carried out a series of indiscriminate poisonings in Japan in 1985 that killed 12.
Siswanto	Indonesia	1994–1996	12		Alias Robot Gedek. Homeless man that killed 12 boys. Sentenced to death on 21 May 1997. Died in prison on 26 March 2007.
Sergey Golovkin	Soviet Union; Russia	1986–1992	11	40+	Killed at least 11 boys in the Moscow area between 1986 and 1992. Executed by gunshot in 1996; last person executed in Russia before the death penalty was abolished.
Tiago Henrique Gomes da Rocha	Brazil	2011–2014	11	39	Gomes da Rocha was a Brazilian security guard who confessed to the murders of 39 people. He was sentenced to 25 years in prison for 11 murders, and attempted suicide while incarcerated.
Herb Baumeister	United States	1990–1996	11	23	Strangled gay men and buried their bodies in his backyard in Indiana and Ohio; 11 men were found in the yard but only five were identified. Died after shooting himself when faced with arrest.
Zhang Yongming	China	2008–2012	11	17–20	Sold flesh of his victims as 'ostrich meat' and kept eyeballs in wine. Executed.
Jack Unterweger	Austria; United States; Czechoslovakia	1974–1992	11	15	Served 14 years in Austrian prison because of a murder in 1974; killed at least nine sex workers after his release. Was a small media star in Austrian media in the early 1990s and, on behalf of Austrian police, was arrested in the US, where he may have killed another three sex workers. Hanged himself in 1994 after being sentenced to life in prison.
Vitaly Manishin	USSR; Russia	1989–2000	11	15	Known as "The Barnaul Maniac"; raped and murdered at least 11 girls and women in Barnaul and Buranovo. He was apprehended in 2023 via DNA evidence and convicted in 2025.
Vaughn Greenwood	United States	1964–1975	11	13	Known as the "Skid Row Slasher". Killed 11 people, suspected of two more. Cut victims' throats from ear to ear and may have drunk their blood. Sentenced to imprisonment for life.
Anthony Sowell	United States	2007–2009	11	11+	Known as The Cleveland Strangler, he was convicted of killing 11 women between 2007 and 2009, and is suspected in another series of murders in the 1980s, with the two sets of killings separated by a 15-year stint in prison. Sentenced to death.
Henri Désiré Landru	France	1915–1919	11	11	Nicknamed "Bluebeard", he put notes in the lonely hearts section of newspapers under different aliases, presenting himself as a widower that wanted to marry a war widow. He killed at least 10 women and the teenage son of one of them, and burned their bodies after he had gained access to their assets. Executed by guillotine in 1922.
Nannie Doss	United States	1927–1954	11	11	Responsible for 11 deaths between 1927 and 1954. Known as the "Giggling Nanny", the "Giggling Granny", and the "Jolly Black Widow". Sentenced to imprisonment for life. Died of leukemia in 1965, age 59.
Marie Alexandrine Becker	Belgium	1933–1936	11	11	Poisoned wealthy clients while working as a seamstress. Died in prison in 1942.
Seisaku Nakamura	Japan	1938–1942	11	11	Teenage serial killer known as the "Hamamatsu Deaf Killer" for having been born deaf. Murdered 11 people (including his brother) and attacked many others, among them his father, sister, brother-in-law and nephew. Tried as an adult and executed by hanging.
Robledo Puch	Argentina	1971	11	11	Convicted of 11 murders and multiple other crimes including attempted murder and sexual assault. Sentenced to life imprisonment in 1980.
Clifford Olson	Canada	1980–1981	11	11	Considered a dangerous offender, meaning that Olson could never have been released from prison. He had three parole applications rejected. Died from cancer in 2011.
Francisco García Escalero	Spain	1987–1994	11	11	Known as "The Killer Beggar". A necrophilic, schizophrenic homeless man found insane and confined to a psychiatric hospital after killing 11 sex workers and other homeless people between 1987 and 1994. Died in 2014.
Henry Louis Wallace	United States	1990–1994	11	11	Murdered 11 black women in Charlotte, North Carolina. The victims were all women that he knew.
Benjamin Atkins	United States	1991–1992	11	11	Known as "The Woodward Corridor Killer". Raped and strangled his victims before abandoning their bodies in vacant buildings. Died in prison in 1997, age 29, from AIDS.
Adnan Çolak	Turkey	1992–1995	11	11	Killed 11 elderly women aged 68 to 95 and raped six others. Sentenced to death but commuted to life in prison after Turkey abolished the death penalty in 2004.
Andre Crawford	United States	1993–1999	11	11	Murdered 11 women between 1993 and 1999. Sentenced to life in prison.
Francisco de Assis Pereira	Brazil	1997–1998	11	11	Rapist and serial killer, known as "O Maníaco do Parque" (The Park Maniac). He was arrested for the torture, rape and death of 11 women and for assaulting nine in a park in São Paulo, Brazil during the 1990s. Pereira found his victims by posing as a talent scout for a modeling agency. Sentenced to 268 years.
Gao Chengyong	China	1998–2002	11	11	Known as "Chinese Jack the Ripper"; killed women and then mutilated their corpses. Executed in 2019.
Yevgeny Petrov	Russia	1998–2003	11	11	Known as the "Novouralsk Ripper"; a child rapist who kidnapped and killed young girls around Novouralsk, mutilating and burning their corpses afterwards; sentenced to life imprisonment.
Ruslan Khamarov	Ukraine	2000–2003	11	11	Seduced, raped and then killed women in his home; sentenced to life imprisonment.
West Mesa Killer	United States	2003–2005	11	11	Remains of 11 women, who disappeared between 2003 and 2005, were found buried in the desert in Albuquerque, New Mexico in 2009 and attributed to a bone collector.
Very Idham Henyansyah	Indonesia	2006–2008	11	11	Known as the "singing serial killer" and "Ryan", the artistic name he adopted while awaiting his execution in prison, where he recorded an album and wrote his autobiography. "Ryan" confessed to murdering 11 people including a toddler; 10 of his victims were buried in his parents' home backyard while the last one was butchered and hidden in a suitcase. Sentenced to death.
Roshu Kha	Bangladesh	2008	11	11	Raped and murdered garment workers after being rejected by his lover. Sentenced to death.
Martin Lecián	Czechoslovakia	1927	11		Responsible for killing 10 policemen and one prison officer. Executed in 1927.
Lonnie David Franklin Jr.	United States	1985–2007	10	25+	Known as the "Grim Sleeper" for the alleged 14-year hiatus he took from murdering between 1988 and 2002. Shot and strangled his victims, mostly women, around South Los Angeles. Sentenced to death. On 28 March 2020, Franklin was found dead in his cell.
Rudolf Pleil	Allied-occupied Germany	1946–1947	10	25	Known as Der Totmacher ("The Deadmaker"). Convicted of killing a salesman and nine women. Claimed to have killed 25. Killed himself by hanging in 1958.
Milton Johnson	United States	1983	10	17	Known as "The Weekend Murderer" killed up to 17 people. Sentenced to life without parole.
Long Island serial killer	United States	1996–2010	10	16	Unidentified serial killer also known as "The Gilgo Beach Killer". Believed to have murdered 10 to 14 people associated with the sex trade over a period of 15 years.
Daniel Lee Siebert	United States	1979–1986	10	13	Convicted of a 1979 manslaughter; killed 10 people across America in three months in mid-1980s including two children and a Southside Slayer victim. Sentenced to death; died from cancer in prison in 2008.
Sergey Cherny	Russia	1999	10	11	Strangled women around Smolensk; suspected of the drowning death of another woman; died in 2001 from pneumonia while in a special psychiatric hospital.
Jeanne Weber	France	1905–1908	10	10+	Transient baby-sitter who strangled children in her care. Declared insane. Hanged herself in prison in 1918.
Nikolai Dzhumagaliev	USSR	1979–1991	10	10+	Lured women in a park at night and hacked them with an axe as part of a plan to rid the world of prostitution. Also cooked parts of his victims and ate them himself or served them to other people as part of ethnic dishes. Found innocent by reason of insanity and interned in a mental institution.
Bobby Joe Long	United States	1984	10	10+	Known as "The Classified Ad Rapist"; killed 10 women in Tampa Bay, Florida, in 1984. Sentenced to death. Executed by lethal injection on 23 May 2019.
Stewart Wilken	South Africa	1990–1997	10	10+	Known as "Boetie Boer"; raped, sodomised and murdered 10 victims from 1990 to 1997. Sentenced to seven life terms.
Viktor Fokin	Russia	1996–2000	10	10+	Known as the "Grandfather Ripper"; pensioner who lured, killed and then dismembered sex workers and alcohol abusers in his home, disposing of the remains in garbage containers after; died while imprisoned at a corrective labor colony.
David Randitsheni	South Africa	2004–2008	10	10+	Kidnapped 19 people, raped 17, and murdered 10. Sentenced to 16 consecutive life sentences plus 220 years in prison; hanged himself three weeks after conviction.
Edmund Kemper	United States	1964–1973	10	10	Known as "The Co-ed Butcher". At age 15, he confessed to murdering his grandparents and served six years as a criminally insane juvenile. He was released in 1969. In 1972 and 1973, he murdered and dismembered six young women, then killed his mother and her friend. He was sentenced to eight counts of seven years to life.
Dennis Rader	United States	1974–2004	10	10+	Known as the BTK Killer. Murdered 10 people in Sedgwick County (in and around Wichita), Kansas, between 1974 and 1991. Sentenced to life imprisonment with no parole for 175 years.
Stanislav Rogolev	Soviet Union	1980–1982	10	10	Known as "Agent 000"; killed and raped women, managing to avoid capture through suspected knowledge of the investigation against him; executed by firing squad in 1984.
Oleg Kuznetsov	Soviet Union; Russia; Ukraine	1991–1992	10	10	Robbed, raped and killed people around Russia and Ukraine; sentenced to death but commuted to life imprisonment.
Satish	India	1995–1998	10	10	Killed 10 girls who were between the ages of five and nine. He was arrested from Bahadurgargh, Haryana after a long chase by Haryana police.
Eduard Shemyakov	Russia	1996–1998	10	10	Known as the "Resort Maniac"; Ukrainian who raped, killed and dismembered women in St. Petersburg, supposedly cannibalizing one of the victims; sentenced to compulsory treatment.
Ali Kaya	Turkey	1997–2014?	10	10	Known as "The Baby Faced Killer"; responsible for 10 murders. Escaped from prison and later recaptured.
Chen Yongfeng	China	2003	10	10	Known as "The Butcher"; killed and dismembered 10 people at his house in the city of Wenzhou in the Zhejiang province within the span of a few months.
Zhou Kehua	China	2004–2012	10	10	A former soldier who targeted ATM users. He killed 10 people and evaded the law for eight years, before being shot in a shootout with police after a year-long manhunt.
Kang Ho-sun	South Korea	2005–2008	10	10	Sentenced to death in 2010 for killing 10 women, including his wife and mother-in-law.
Masten Wanjala	Kenya	2015–2021	10	10	Described as a "bloodthirsty vampire"; confessed to killing and drinking the blood of multiple children in Nairobi and led police to the bodies of some of the victims. Wanjala escaped from police custody while awaiting trial, but was later found in Bungoma County and murdered by angry locals.
Louis van Schoor	South Africa	1986–1989	9	100	Former security guard who was convicted of seven murders and two assassinations, but confessed to a reporter that he murdered 100 people; sentenced to 20 years in prison and released on parole in 2004.
Peter Kürten	German Empire; Germany	1913–1930	9	79	Charged with nine murders and seven attempted murders. Dubbed "The Vampire of Düsseldorf" by the contemporary media. Executed by guillotine in 1931.
Roger Dale Stafford	United States	1974–1978	9	34	Killed nine people in two states, including a family of three; his wife implicated him in 34 total murders in different states; executed by lethal injection in 1995.
Norman Afzal Simons	South Africa	1986–1994	9	22	Known as the "Station Strangler", convicted of only one of 22 cases of murder and sodomy of young children near Cape Town. Sentenced to imprisonment for life.
Francis Heaulme	France	1984–1992	9	20	Convicted of killing nine people, but suspected in the murder of dozens. He is known as the "Criminal Backpacker" due to his travels throughout France. He left a trail of bodies wherever he went.
Joel Rifkin	United States	1989–1993	9	17	Known as "The Drifter", killed sex workers in New York City, most of them drug addicts. Convicted of nine murders but believed to have committed 17; also suspected of being the unidentified Long Island serial killer. Sentenced to 203 years to imprisonment for life.
Dagmar Overbye	Denmark	1913–1920	9	15	Murdered between nine and 25 children—of which one was her own—during a seven-year period. In 1921, she was sentenced to death in one of the most talked about trials in Danish history, that changed legislation on childcare. The sentence was later commuted to life in prison. Overbye was working as a professional child minder, caring for babies born outside of marriage, murdering her charges. She strangled them, drowned them or burned them to death in her masonry heater. The corpses were either cremated, buried or hidden in the loft. Died in prison in 1929.
Kenneth McDuff	United States	1966–1992	9	14+	Known as "The Broomstick Killer"; death sentence for 1966 triple-murder was commuted. Killed again three days after 1989 parole and 10 further times in Waco, Texas until 1992. Executed by lethal injection in 1998.
Robert Joseph Silveria Jr.	United States	1981–1996	9	14+	Known as "The Boxcar Killer"; freight train rider convicted of beating to death fellow transients and confessed to dozens more.
Dr. No	United States	1981–1990	9	12	Supposedly murdered sex workers and exotic dancers; his first victim was Marcia King, who was identified in 2018.
Richard Biegenwald	United States	1958–1983	9	11+	Known as "The Thrill Killer". Killed at least nine people in Monmouth County, New Jersey and is suspected in at least two other murders. Died of respiratory and kidney failure in 2008.
New Bedford Highway Killer	United States	1988–1989	9	11	Unidentified serial killer who killed nine women and disappearance of two others between 1988 and 1989.
Alexander Bychkov	Russia	2009–2012	9	11	Described in his personal diary how he killed 11 men who were alcoholics and tramps. Confessed to eating body parts of his victims. Found guilty of nine murders and sentenced to life imprisonment.
Maryvale serial shooter	United States	2015–2016	9	11	Motorist who shot 12 people in separate events in Phoenix, Arizona, killing nine. Aaron Saucedo was charged with the shootings and two additional murders in 2017.
Edgecombe County Serial Killer	United States	2000s	9	10	Unidentified serial killer who killed nine women and possibly another who disappeared since 2005 around Rocky Mount, North Carolina. Antwan Pittman was convicted in one case.
Sergei Martynov	Russia	1992–2010	9	9+	Convicted of raping and murdering a woman in 1992. Sentenced to life imprisonment for killing eight more women during a violent crime spree between 2005 and 2010.
Lloyd Gomez	United States	1950–1951	9	9	Known as "The Phantom Hobo Killer"; homeless man who killed other homeless men across California in the early 1950s.
Timothy Krajcir	United States	2000s	9	9	Killed nine women across Pennsylvania, Illinois, Kentucky and Missouri (five in Cape Girardeau) in the 1970s and 1980s.
Anatoly Utkin	Soviet Union	1968–1973	9		Known as "Ulyanovsky maniac"; killed eight girls and one man from 1968 to 1973; executed 1975.
Gilberto Chamba	Ecuador; Spain	1988–2004	9		Taxi driver known as "The Monster of Machala", between 1988 and 1993 abducted 10 of his passengers (all lone female students) in this Ecuadorian city and killed eight, often raping them afterward with a stick. Though sentenced to 16 years in prison, he benefited from an amnesty campaign in 2000 that also cleared his criminal record and moved to Spain, where he was arrested for the rape and murder of another student and the attempted rape and murder of a prostitute in 2004. Sentenced in 2005 to 45 years in prison.
Ondrej Rigo	Czechoslovakia; Germany; Netherlands	1990–1992	9		Slovak serial killer and necrophile who committed his murders during the early 1990s in Slovakia, Germany and the Netherlands. He was arrested in 1992 and received a life sentence in 1994. He remains the murderer with the biggest number of victims in the modern history of Slovakia.
Alfred Gaynor	United States	1995–1998	9		Crack cocaine addict. Killed nine women in Massachusetts. Sentenced to life in prison on 19 May 2000.
Mark Goudeau	United States	2005–2006	9		Known as "The Baseline Killer"; convicted of nine murders in Phoenix, Arizona.
Keith Hunter Jesperson	United States	1990–1995	8	160	Dubbed the "Happy Face Killer", Jesperson was convicted of killing eight women by strangulation.
Rodney Alcala	United States	1971–1979	8	130+	Known as the "Dating Game Killer" for appearing on the game show The Dating Game in the middle of his killing years. Was convicted of at least five murders, though his actual total is estimated to be much higher.
Ottis Toole	United States	1980–1983	8	100–125	Initially convicted of three counts of murder, later pleaded guilty to four more murders before dying in prison. A sometime accomplice of convicted serial killer Henry Lee Lucas, Toole admitted to—and retracted multiple times—over 100 counts of murder, rape, arson and cannibalism, and was suspected in several other unsolved murders. In 2008, police announced that they had identified Toole as the likely murderer of Adam Walsh, and would be closing the case as a result.
Kiyotaka Katsuta	Japan	1982–1983	8	22	Strangled or shot people to rob them, using a gun he had stolen from a policeman after running him over with his car. Hanged in 2000.
Joseph Paul Franklin	United States	1977–1980	8	20+	White supremacist shooter who confessed to 20 murders and several attempted murders. Executed by lethal injection in 2013.
Pierre Chanal	France	1980–1988	8	17	Military instructor suspected of killing boys and men in Marne; killed himself before trial.
Christopher Wilder	United States	1984	8	13+	Killed eight women during a spree before accidentally shooting himself; suspected in the disappearance and murder of more than five more.
Axeman of New Orleans	United States	1918–1919	8	12+	Unidentified serial killer of at least eight people in the New Orleans area from May 1918 to October 1919.
Vladimir Retunsky	Russia	1990–1996	8	12	Known as the "Povorinsky Maniac"; kidnapped, raped and killed hitchhikers in his hometown of Povorino, possibly abusing their corpses; initially sentenced to death, but later reduced to 15 years' imprisonment and released in 2015.
Gilbert Paul Jordan	Canada	1965–1987	8	10	Known as the "Boozing Barber", he would typically find alcoholic women in bars in Vancouver's destitute Downtown Eastside, buy them drinks or pay them for sex and encourage them to drink with him. When they passed out, he would pour more liquor down their throats. The resulting deaths were reported as alcohol poisoning and generally ignored by police as the intentional murders blended in with the common occurrence in that neighbourhood. Died in 2006.
Frankford Slasher	United States	1985–1990	8	9	Allegedly responsible for nine murders in the Frankford neighborhood of Philadelphia, Pennsylvania; Leonard Christopher was convicted of one murder; another murder was committed in same style while he was incarcerated; believed to still be at large.
Kendall Francois	United States	1996–1998	8	9	Admitted to killing eight sex workers in Poughkeepsie, New York, but denied involvement with the disappearance of a ninth prostitute.
Hilda Nilsson	Sweden	1915–1917	8	8+	Known as the "baby farming" killer; she killed babies she received custody of by drowning them in a wash basin. Convicted for the murder of seven infants and the manslaughter of an eighth. She was the last Swede sentenced to death whose sentence was not commuted.
Yoshio Kodaira	China; Japan	1932–1946	8	8+	A serial rapist, Kodaira killed his father-in-law in 1932 and seven to 10 women in Japan between 1945 and 1946, engaging in necrophilia after the fifth murder. Previously (1920s) he had been deployed to Northern China as a sailor in the Imperial Japanese Navy, where he was free to target the locals. Hanged in 1949.
John Christie	United Kingdom	1943–1953	8	8+	Serial killer and alleged necrophile active during the 1940s and early 1950s. He murdered at least eight people—including his wife, Ethel—by strangling them in his flat at 10 Rillington Place, Notting Hill, London. The bodies of three of Christie's victims were found in a wallpaper-covered kitchen alcove soon after Christie moved out of Rillington Place during March 1953. The remains of two more victims were discovered in the garden, and his wife's body was found beneath the floorboards of the front room. Christie was arrested and convicted of his wife's murder, for which he was hanged.
Eric Edgar Cooke	Australia	1958–1963	8	8+	Known as the "Night Caller" and later the "Nedlands Monster"; killed at least eight people and attempted to kill at least 14 in and around Perth between 1959 and 1963; he was the last person to be hanged in Western Australia.
John Edward Robinson	United States	1984–2000	8	8+	Known as "The Slavemaster"; lured victims through the internet.
Bruce McArthur	Canada	2010–2017	8	8	One of the oldest known serial killers, active at 65, he lured men to secret sexual encounters involving drugs and bondage, killed them and dismembered their bodies which he hid in garden planters.
Paul Ogorzow	(Nazi Germany) Germany	1940–1941	8		Known as the "S-Bahn murderer"; SA sergeant convicted of raping and murdering eight women by throwing them off trains in Berlin during blackouts in 1940 and 1941. Executed by guillotine at the Plötzensee Prison on 26 July 1941.
Genzo Kurita	Japan	1948–1952	8		Serial rapist and murderer, engaging in necrophilia in two of his murders. Two other victims were the children of the woman he targeted, whom Kurita threw off a cliff (a third child survived). Hanged in 1959.
Marie Noe	United States	1949–1968	8		Murdered eight of her children between 1949 and 1968.
Kiyoshi Okubo	Japan	1971	8		Raped and murdered eight women aged 17 to 21 upon his release from prison, where he had been for previous rapes. Hanged in 1976.
Marybeth Tinning	United States	1972–1983	8		Suffocated eight of her nine children during the 1970s. One daughter died of natural causes shortly after birth, the first of the Tinning children to die.
Michael Bruce Ross	United States	1981–1984	8		Ross confessed to all of the murders, and was convicted of four of them. He was executed by the state of Connecticut on 13 May 2005 by lethal injection, making it the first execution in Connecticut and the whole of New England since 1960.
Gary C. Evans	United States	1985–1998	8		Befriended the Son of Sam killer while incarcerated. Released in 1984, he proceeded to burglarize and kill while in and out of jails for over 13 years. Aided investigators in a high-profile murder case before dodging parole and being chased. The manhunt finally ended when he jumped to his death off a bridge.
Alan Wade Wilmer Sr.	United States	1986–1989	8	14	Proven to have murdered eight people in Virginia between 1986 and 1989, with an additional 6 suspected; proven to have killed three pairs of couples and two individuals. The remaining suspected victims consist of two pairs of couples and two individuals, bringing the total to 14.
Sean Vincent Gillis	United States	1994–2003	8		Kidnapped, raped, and mutilated the corpses of Louisiana women.
Vladimir Mukhankin	Russia	1995–1996	8		Known as "The pupil of Chikatilo"; he killed eight women.
Manuel Delgado Villegas	Spain; France (claimed); Italy (claimed)	1964–1971	7	48	Wandering criminal known as El Arropiero ("The Arrope Trader") and El Estrangulador del Puerto ("The Strangler of Puerto"). Confessed to the impulsive murders of 48 people of different sex, age, wealth and sexual orientation in three countries (including his girlfriend, whom he strangled during sex), but police only investigated him for 22 murders in Spain and was considered proven author of seven. Some of his victims were killed with hand to hand combat techniques that he had learned in the Spanish Foreign Legion. Diagnosed with XYY syndrome and interned in a mental institution until his death in 1998.
Ershad Sikder	Bangladesh	1991–1999	7	43+	Career criminal and corrupt politician responsible for numerous torture murders in the 1990s; convicted on seven counts and executed 2004.
Diego Alexánder Ruiz Restrepo	Chile	2018–2020	7	27	Known as the "Psychopath of Meiggs". Illegal Colombian immigrant who has been living in Chile since 2013, often resorting to robbing and killing homeless people. Although he has had only 8 confirmed victims, he is currently being investigated for 20 more, which, if confirmed, would turn him into the most murderous serial killer in Chilean history.
Ivan Milat	Australia	1990s	7	23–39	Convicted of the Backpacker murders; sentenced to seven consecutive life sentences plus 18 years without the possibility of parole. May have had accomplices.
Reta Mays	United States	2017–2018	7	20	Nursing assistant who killed elderly military veterans at a VA hospital in Clarksburg, West Virginia, by injecting them with lethal doses of insulin.
Stockton serial shootings	United States	2021–2022	7	8	On 15 October 2022, a Stockton man, Wesley Brownlee, was arrested in connection to the shootings.
Michael Wayne McGray	Canada; United States	1985–1988	7	18+	Convicted of the murder of six people in the late 1990s, including a woman and her 11-year-old daughter. Claims to have killed 11 others, including murders committed while on parole and while on a three-day pass from prison. Finally imprisoned for life, killed a cellmate in 2010.
Łódź Gay Murderer	Poland	1988–1993	7	7	Unidentified serial killer who killed gay men in Łódź, estimated to have killed seven people.
John Floyd Thomas Jr.	United States	1957–2009	7	15+	Serial murderer and rapist with one of the longest criminal careers in the US.
Kenneth Erskine	United Kingdom	1986	7	11	Known as "The Stockwell Strangler", he was a burglar who raped and strangled at least seven elderly women after breaking into their homes.
David Carpenter	United States	1979–1981	7	11	Known as "The Trailside Killer"; murdered women on San Francisco-area hiking trails between 1979 and 1981. Sentenced to death.
Vladimir Kuzmin	Russia	1997	7	11	Raped, murdered and robbed mostly young boys and men in Moscow; assisted in his first two murders by Denis Kalistratov; sentenced to life imprisonment.
Tommy Recco	France	1960–1980	7	10	Murdered his godfather in 1960; after release, killed six cashiers in two separate store raids; also suspected of murdering a trio of German tourists.
Derrick Todd Lee	United States	2002	7	10	Known as the "Baton Rouge or South Louisiana Serial Killer" convicted of three murders. Believed to have murdered several other women in Louisiana, Mississippi and Alabama. Sentenced to death, died in 2016.
Tomás Maldonado Cera	Colombia	2002–2018	7	10	Known as "The Satanist"; killed people in Barranquilla for the purpose of satanic rituals.
Peter Manuel	United Kingdom	1956–1958	7	9	Hanged in 1958 after being convicted of seven murders at a sensational trial in Glasgow, may have committed two more.
Terry Blair	United States	1982–2004	7	9	Kansas City serial killer and rapist; active 1982–2004. Sentenced to life.
Doug Clark	United States	1980	7	8+	Boiler operator who killed sex workers in Los Angeles. One of the "Sunset Strip Killers".
Stanisław Modzelewski	Poland	1952–1967	7	8	Known as "The Vampire of Gałkówek". Confessed to strangling eight women, but convicted of seven because one of the bodies was never found.
Michael Hughes	United States	1986–1993	7	8	Killed six women and a schoolgirl in the South Los Angeles area between 1986 and 1993.
Santa Rosa Hitchhiker Killer	United States	1972–1973	7	7+	"Santa Rosa Hitchhiker Murders": Series of at least seven unsolved homicides involving female hitchhikers that took place in Sonoma County and Santa Rosa of the North Bay area of California in 1972 and 1973.
Roger Kibbe	United States	1977–1987	7	7+	Known as "The I-5 Strangler", killed seven women between 1977 and 1987 – six along I-5 near Sacramento, and one in Walnut Creek, California. He was tried for the Walnut Creek murder by the Grand Jury before the body was found but in exchange for helping to find the body Kibbe was spared the death penalty and received life in prison. It took detectives 34 years to find the body.
Connecticut River Valley Killer	United States	1978–1987	7	7+	Believed responsible for a series of similar knife murders mostly in and around Claremont, New Hampshire, and the Connecticut River Valley, primarily in the 1980s.
Paul Durousseau	United States	1997–2003	7	7+	A former soldier who strangled several women between the ages of 17 and 26 in the southeastern United States. He had the moniker of the Jacksonville Ripper and had the reputation of being a lewd womanizer.
Todd Kohlhepp	United States	2003–2016	7	7+	A registered sex offender; shot up a motorcycle shop in 2003, killing four; killed three more victims in 2015 and 2016; is currently serving seven life sentences for his crimes.
Darren Deon Vann	United States	2014 and earlier	7	7+	Confessed to the murders of at least seven women.
William Edward Wells	United States	2003–2019	7	7	Known as the "Monster of Mayport", Wells killed his wife and four other people in 2003, and killed two prisoners between 2011 and 2019. Sentenced to death for the seventh murder.
Aileen Wuornos	United States	1989–1990	7	7	Sex worker in Florida who shot seven of her male clients at point blank range, then robbed them. Subject of the 2003 film Monster. Executed in 2002.
Hu Daoping	China	2003–2005	7	7	Career criminal who, following a jail escape in 1998, killed seven people during robberies.
Nikos Metaxas	Cyprus	2016–2018	7	7	A 35-year-old Cypriot Army officer who killed five women and two children between September 2016 and August 2018. These became known as the "Mitsero murders". Sentenced to seven life sentences.
José Misael Roldán Concha	Chile	1954–1957	7	7	Killed an iron mine worker in 1954. After being free on parole, he killed a woman and five of her seven children. Originally sentenced to death, but was later imprisoned for life after a presidential pardon.
Sataro Fukiage	Japan	1906–1924	7		Killed seven girls aged 11 to 16 and raped between 93 and 100. Hanged in 1926.
Václav Mrázek	Czechoslovakia	1951–1956	7		Killed seven women in Chomutov. Executed in 1957.
Anatoly Slivko	Soviet Union	1961–1985	7		As a member of the Young Pioneers (Soviet Boy Scouts), Slivko gained the trust of 43 young boys over almost three decades, asphyxiated them until they fell unconscious, and then ritually molested, filmed, photographed and resuscitated them. The seven boys that didn't wake up were dismembered and burned. Minutes before his execution in 1989, police asked Slivko for advice in the investigation of Andrei Chikatilo's crimes.
Cincinnati Strangler	United States	1965–1966	7		Raped and strangled seven mostly elderly women in Cincinnati, Ohio between 1965 and 1966. Believed to be Posteal Laskey, who was convicted of one murder and died in prison on 29 May 2007.
Émile Louis	France	1975–1978	7		Bus driver that preyed on young handicapped women (seven murders) in the 1970s. Sentenced to life in prison on 25 November 2004.
Paul Steven Haigh	Australia	1978–1991	7		Sentenced to life imprisonment without parole for the murders of seven people in Victoria.
Roberto Succo	Italy; France	1981–1988	7		In 1986 he escaped the mental hospital where he was recluded in for murdering his parents five years earlier and began a crime spree in Europe that included burglary, hijacking, kidnapping, rape and murder and earned him the Public Enemy Number One spot in Italy, France and Switzerland. Committed suicide in prison after failing to escape a second time.
Walter E. Ellis	United States	1986–2007	7		Known as "The Milwaukee North Side Strangler"; convicted of killing seven sex workers in Wisconsin between 1986 and 2007. Died in prison on 1 December 2013.
Harrison Graham	United States	1987	7		Convicted of killing seven women in Philadelphia and keeping their bodies in his apartment.
Guy Georges	France	1991–1997	7		Known as the "Beast of the Bastille"; serving a life sentence for seven murders between 1991 and 1997.
Motta Navas	India	1996–2012	7		Active in Kollam, Kerala, Navas was arrested and imprisoned for his first two murders in 1996 and 2007. During his final crime spree in 2012, he bludgeoned to death five elderly pavement dwellers in their sleep, always after midnight. He feigned a mental illness to avoid suspicion by the police in at least two occasions.
Samuel Sidyno	South Africa	1998–1999	7		Known as the "Capital Hill Serial Killer" murdered seven people in Pretoria from 1998 to 1999.
Ripper Jayanandan	India	2003–2006	7		Killed seven people during robberies. Sentenced to death.
Sibusiso Duma	South Africa	2007	7		Murdered seven people in the Pietermaritzburg area of KwaZulu Natal in 2007.
William Devin Howell	United States	2003	7		Murdered seven women in Connecticut, was born in Hampton, Virginia. Known as the "Sick Ripper".
Tommy Lynn Sells	United States	1980–1999	6	22–70	Drifter active throughout the United States who specialized in killing children and multiple victims after breaking into their homes. Caught when a 10-year-old girl survived his attack and provided a description of him. Executed in 2014.
Volker Eckert	East Germany; Germany; France; Spain; Czech Republic (suspected); Italy (suspected)	1974–2006	6	19+	German trucker who confessed to having abducted, tortured and killed five sex workers through his route in Western Europe, plus strangling a 14-year-old girl in his native West Germany in 1974, when he was 15. Police considered him perpetrator of nine murders (with four more being possible); he hanged himself in prison before being convicted.
Lorenzo Gilyard	United States	1977–1993	6	13+	Known as "The Kansas City Strangler". Killed up to 13 sex workers in the Kansas City area from 1977 to 1993. Sentenced to life in 2007.
Władysław Mazurkiewicz	Poland	1950s	6	30	Known as "The Gentleman Killer". Indicted of, and confessed to having committed 30 murders; convicted of six and hanged in 1957.
Steve Wright	United Kingdom	1999–2006	6	22	Referred to as the "Ipswich Ripper", "Suffolk Ripper", "Suffolk Strangler", "East Anglia Ripper", "Red Light Ripper" and "the Suffolkator". Murdered five sex workers, all of whom worked in Ipswich, in 2006, and a 17-year-old girl in 1999. There are possible links to previous East Anglia prostitute killings.
Gong Runbo	China	2005–2006	6	20+	Found guilty of the murders of six children and teenagers aged between nine and 16 from 2005 to 2006; executed in 2007.
The Doodler	United States	1974–1975	6	16	Unidentified serial killer who sketched then stabbed to death 14 gay men in San Francisco. Surviving victims did not wish to testify, so the killer was not identified.
Cristopher Chávez Cuellar	Colombia	1990s–2015	6	15+	Known as "The Soulless"; killed between six and at least 15 people starting from the 1990s, including four underage brothers; sentenced to 40 years' imprisonment.
András Pándy	Belgium	1986–1990	6	14+	Former clergyman nicknamed "Father Bluebeard", killed his two wives and four of his children with the help of a fifth he was having an incestuous affair with, and whom denounced him to the authorities seven years later. Sentenced to life imprisonment in 2002.
John Wayne Glover	Australia	1989–1990	6	13	British ex-pat living in Australia. Known by the media as "The Granny Killer" as he targeted elderly women; killed himself while in prison in 2005.
Alexander Sergeychik	Belarus	2000–2006	6	12	Killed between six and 12 people under the influence of alcohol. Executed in 2007.
Adrián Arroyo Gutiérrez	Costa Rica	2014–2015	6	11	Known as "The Southern Psychopath"; raped and strangled drug-addicted sex workers in San José; sentenced to 110 years' imprisonment.
Joseph Naso	United States	1977–1994	6	10	A freelance photographer who raped and strangled women in California. Arrested in 2011 and sentenced to death two years later. Known as "The Double Initial Killer" since first four victims to be identified bore double initials.
John George Haigh	United Kingdom	1944–1949	6	9	Called the "Acid Bath Murderer" for dissolving his victims in sulphuric acid under the belief that he could not be prosecuted for murder if no body was found. He would then forge papers to sell the victims possessions. Confessed nine murders, convicted of six and hanged.
Jack the Stripper	United Kingdom	1964–1965	6	8	Murdered at least six sex workers in London and may have been responsible for the deaths of two others before that. Remains unidentified.
Morris Solomon Jr.	United States	1986–1987	6	7	Handyman who killed six young women between 1986 and 1987 in Sacramento, California. Sentenced to death on 16 September 1992.
Mack Ray Edwards	United States	1953–1970	6	6+	Molester. Murdered two young girls and four young boys. Claimed at one point to have killed as many as 18.
Terry Peder Rasmussen	United States	1978–2002	6	6+	Known as the "Chameleon Killer"; main suspect in the Bear Brook murders, as well as other murders.
Robert Berdella	United States	1984–1987	6	6+	Berdella abducted, raped, tortured, and murdered at least six men.
Juan Chavez	United States	1986–1990	6	6+	Murdered six men in Los Angeles County in what he claimed was a retaliation against the AIDS epidemic.
David Berkowitz	United States	1976–1977	6	6	Known as "Son of Sam", he went after young women and couples killing six people and wounding seven others with a .44 caliber Bulldog revolver. He was caught when an eyewitness to his last murder saw he had a parking ticket on his car. He was sentenced to life in prison with parole in 1978.
Richard Chase	United States	1977–1978	6	6	Known as "The Vampire of Sacramento" because he drank his victims' blood and cannibalized their remains. He killed six people in the span of a month in Sacramento, California. The 1987 film Rampage was loosely based on based on Chase's crimes.
Michael Terry	United States	1985–1986	6	6	Murdered six men in Atlanta, Georgia in a 10-month period, via stabbing or shooting. Sentenced to life imprisonment in 1988.
Lázaro Barbosa de Sousa	Brazil	2006–2021	6	6	Convicted of a double murder in 2007; later escaped from prison and murdered a family of four before dying in a shootout with the police.
Alfredo Galán	Spain	2003	6	6	Shot random people over the course of three months, killing six and wounding three. He would sometimes leave a Spanish playing card at the scene of the crime as a signature.
Friedrich Schumann	Germany	1918–1920	6		Killed six people and executed in 1921.
Eugen Weidmann	France	1937	6		German who strangled and robbed American dancer Jean de Koven, shot a former accomplice, and shot dead and robbed four other people around Paris in 1937.
Rhonda Belle Martin	United States	1937–1951	6		Alabama poisoner who murdered six family members; executed in 1957.
Leslie Irvin	United States	1954–1955	6		Known as "The Mad Dog Killer"; Killed six people in robberies in the mid-1950s; his Supreme Court case set a precedent for fair trials of highly publicized defendants.
Lemuel Smith	United States	1958–1981	6		Confessed to the murders of five people, including an on-duty female prison guard. Sentenced to death on 10 June 1983. Commuted to life in 1984.
Freeway Phantom	United States	1971–1972	6		Raped and strangled six young women and girls in Washington, D.C. in the early 1970s, dumping their bodies by freeways.
David Mason	United States	1980–1982	6		Strangled four elderly neighbors, his cellmate when imprisoned on lesser charges; shot his boyfriend.
Dayton Leroy Rogers	United States	1983–1987	6		Killed street women, usually addicts, sex workers and runaways. He would tie, rape, and kill them in a forest.
Norbert Poehlke	West Germany	1984–1985	6		Known as "The Hammer-Killer", German police officer who was found, after his suicide in 1985, to have committed several bank robberies and murders.
Wolfgang Schmidt	East Germany; Germany	1989–1991	6		Known as the "Beast of Beelitz". Killed five women and a three-month old baby from 1989 to 1991. Currently in a psychiatric hospital.
Cleophus Prince Jr.	United States	1990	6		Known as "The Clairemont Killer"; raped and killed six women in San Diego in 1990.
Nathaniel White	United States	1991–1992	6		Convicted of stabbing to death six women in the Hudson Valley, New York area from 1991 to 1992.
Samuel Bongani Mfeka	South Africa	1993–1996	6		Killed six women from 1993 to 1996 and sentenced to life imprisonment.
Gary Ray Bowles	United States	1994	6		Beat and strangled six men to steal their credit cards in 1994.
Rory Enrique Conde	United States	1994–1995	6		Known as "The Tamiami Trail Strangler". Killed six sex workers in Florida. Sentenced to death on 7 March 2000.
Daniel Blank	United States	1996–1997	6		Dubbed the River Parishes serial killer, Blank murdered six elderly people in Louisiana. Sentenced to death in 1999.
Nicholas Lungisa Ncama	South Africa	1997	6		Murdered six people in the Eastern Cape, 1997.
Aleksandr Rubel	Estonia	1997–1998	6		He was intoxicated on gasoline vapour during his murders. Sentenced as a minor to the maximum punishment allowed by law — eight years' imprisonment — he was released in 2006.
Céline Lesage	France	2000–2007	6		Killed seven of her newborn babies and sentenced to 15 years in prison.
Filiberto Hernández Martínez	Mexico	2010–2013	6		Killed six people from 2010 to 2013 in Tamuín.
Zodiac Killer	United States	1968–1969	5	37	Targeted young couples. Remains unsolved but open in the California jurisdictions where the five certain Zodiac murders occurred. Potentially 37 total victims claimed but unverified.
Carl Panzram	United States; (Portugal) Portuguese Angola (claimed)	1915–1929	5	22	From 1920 to 1928, he claimed in a posthumous autobiography to have committed over 22 killings, and sodomy of more than 1000 young men. Executed in 1930 by hanging.
Sean Lannon	United States	2021	5	16	Killed at least five people in New Mexico and New Jersey, including his ex-wife, but claimed to have killed 16.
Stephen Akinmurele	United Kingdom	1995–1998	5	15	Nigerian man who killed himself after being charged for the murders of five elderly people in Blackpool and Isle of Man. He confessed to the murders. Links to 10 other unsolved murders in the areas were investigated by police.
Joe Metheny	United States	1976–1996	5	13	Butchered his victims, then served them at BBQs at his roadside stand; died in prison.
Stephen A. Nash	United States	1955–1956	5	11	Killed at least five boys and men in California, confessed to murdering a total of 11 male victims. Sentenced to death and executed in the gas chamber in 1959.
Michel Peiry	Switzerland`France; United States; Yugoslavia (suspected); Italy (suspected)	1981–1987	5	11	Known as the "Sadist of Romont"; Swiss serial killer who sexually abused and murdered at least five hitchhikers in several countries; sentenced to life imprisonment.
Hubert Pilčík	Czechoslovakia	1948–1951	5	10+	Made money smuggling people across the Czechoslovakia-Germany border, but killed most of his customers. Total number of his victims is unknown.
Melvin Rees	United States	1957–1959	5	9	Known as "The Sex Beast"; shot and defiled a woman in 1957, torture-murdered a family of four in 1959 and suspected in four other killings.
David Maust	West Germany; United States	1974–2003	5	9	Killed teenage boys; caught when bodies of three boys were found in the concrete floor of his basement in Hammond, Indiana. Committed suicide in prison in 2006.
William Patrick Fyfe	Canada	1979–1999	5	9	Convicted of killing five women in the Montreal area of Quebec, although he claims to have killed four others. Serving a life sentence in West Canada.
Willem van Eijk	Netherlands	1971–2001	5	8	Dutch serial killer known as "Het Beest van Harkstede" (The Beast of Harkstede). All proven victims he killed were all sex workers. Sentenced to 18 years' imprisonment for his first two murders and killed three more after his release. Sentenced to life imprisonment in 2002 and died in 2019 in prison. Suspected of having killed three more sex workers.
Danny Rolling	United States	1989–1990	5	8	Known as the "Gainesville Ripper"; murdered five students in August 1990. Executed on 6 October 2006. Shortly before his execution, he gave a handwritten confession to authorities for a triple homicide of an elderly man, his adult daughter, and young grandson that occurred years earlier in Rolling's hometown of Shreveport, LA. Although Rolling was never officially charged or extradicted to LA to stand trial for the "Grissom Murders", Shreveport Police had confirmed even before the confession that Rolling had long been considered the lone suspect and the case was closed.
Allan Joseph Legere	Canada	1989	5	7+	Convicted of killing five people in the Miramichi area, New Brunswick. Died in prison.
Joseph E. Duncan III	United States	1996–2005	5	7	Convicted of killing a California boy in 1997 and four members of an Idaho family in 2005. Confessed to two 1996 murders in Washington state, but was not formally charged. Died while awaiting execution on US federal death row.
Vincent Johnson	United States	1999–2000	5	6	"The Brooklyn Strangler".
Vinko Pintarić	SFR Yugoslavia	1973–1990	5	5+	Murdered five people, including his wife, between 1973 and 1990. Escaped from custody three times, killed in a 1991 shootout with the police.
Edward Edwards	United States	1977–1996	5	5+	Shot a young couple in 1977 and stabbed and strangled another in 1980; died months prior to execution on 7 April 2011, for shooting his foster son in 1996 insurance murder.
Thomas Dillon	United States	1989–1992	5	5+	Killed outdoorsmen in rural Ohio by sniping them from afar with a hunting rifle.
Marc Dutroux	Belgium	1995–1996	5	5+	Child molester who killed four of possibly 11 victims. He was also convicted for murdering one of his partners in crime.
William Dathan Holbert	Panama	2010 and earlier	5	5+	Known as "Wild Bill"; American expatriate who had the bodies of five other Americans buried on his property. He would kill people to get their money and properties. His wife, Laura Michelle Reese, was also arrested.
Sek Kim Wah	Singapore	1983	5	5	Sek Kim Wah, who was of Chinese Singaporean descent, was 19 years old when he killed five victims in two separate robbery cases, using raffia string to strangle them. Other methods employed were hitting their heads with a heavy object (like a wooden stool) and electrocution (which was unsuccessful). He robbed and killed a couple before abandoning their corpses at Seletar Reservoir on 30 June 1983 and then, on 23 July 1983, killed three more people at Andrew Road with an accomplice who did not take part in the killings. He was arrested and indicted for murder six days later and was sentenced to death on 14 August 1985; he lost an appeal and he was hanged on 9 December 1988.
Jerome Dennis	United States	1991–1992	5	5	Killed Newark women while on parole.
Hugo Bustamante	Chile	1996–2020	5	5	He killed his partner and her son and hid their bodies in a drum in 2005; after being released, he raped, murdered, and dismembered his new partner's daughter in 2020. While in prison, he confessed to two more murders committed in 1996.
Belize Ripper	Belize	1998–2000	5	5	The Belize Ripper was an unidentified Belizean serial killer who abducted and murdered five young girls in Belize City between 1998 and 2000.
Elroy Chester	United States	1997–1998	5	5	Murdered four white people in racially motivated attacks, and also admitted to the murder of his brother-in-law. In addition, he was linked to four non-fatal shootings and three rapes.
Elisabeth Wiese	(German Empire) Germany	1902–1903	5		Known as the "Angel Maker of St. Pauli"; baby farmer who poisoned her grandchild and four others with morphine and burned their bodies in a stove in 1902 and 1903.
Phantom Killer	United States	1946	5		Believed to have committed the Texarkana Moonlight Murders in Texas between 23 February and 4 May 1946.
San Mateo slasher	United States	1976	5		Known as the "Gypsy Hill killings"; five unsolved killings, of young women in San Mateo County, California during early 1976.
Honolulu Strangler	United States	1985–1986	5		Raped and strangled five young women in Hawaii in 1985 and 1986.
Anthony Kirkland	United States	1987–2009	5		Kirkland murdered four females between 2006 and 2009, three of them children, following a 16-year prison term for the murder of another woman.
William MacDonald	Australia	1961–1962	5		Murdered derelicts in Sydney and Brisbane between 1960 and 1962; sentenced to five consecutive life sentences.
Harry Powers	United States	1931	5		"Lonely Hearts" swindler and conman. Killed two women and three children in Quiet Dell, West Virginia. Arrested after the bodies were found buried near his garage in 1931 and hanged in 1932.
Anna Marie Hahn	United States	1933–1937	5		German-born murder-for-profit killer who poisoned five elderly men; executed in 1938.
Robert Nixon	United States	1936–1938	5		Killed five women in the 1930s with bricks. Executed by electrocution in Illinois on 15 June 1939.
Waneta Hoyt	United States	1965–1971	5		New York woman who murdered her five children.
Janie Lou Gibbs	United States	1966–1967	5		Georgia poisoner who killed five family members. Sentenced to life. Died in prison on 7 February 2010.
Bernard Giles	United States	1973	5		Rapist who murdered five girls and women in Titusville, Florida, in late 1973.
South Dade Killer	United States	1975	5		Known as the "Flat-Tire murders". Killed five women in 1975.
Gerald Parker	United States	1978–1979	5		Known as "The Bedroom Basher" raped and murdered five women and killed the unborn baby of a sixth woman in Orange County, California.
Phillip Carl Jablonski	United States	1978–1991	5		Convicted of killing five women in California and Utah between 1978 and 1991. Sentenced to death in 1994.
Arthur Gary Bishop	United States	1979–1983	5		Utah man who murdered five young boys; executed in 1988.
Faryion Wardrip	United States	1984–1986	5		Killed five young women around Wichita Falls, Texas between 1984 and 1986.
Timothy Wilson Spencer	United States	1984–1987	5		Known as "The Southside Strangler"; raped and killed five women in Virginia. Executed in the electric chair on 27 April 1994.
Robert Shulman	United States	1991–1996	5		Convicted of murdering five sex workers between 1991 and 1996.
Elias Abuelazam	United States	2009–2010	5		Known as "The Serial Slasher". Israeli-Arab immigrant that stabbed victims to death. Sentenced to life on 25 June 2012.
Joachim Knychała	Poland	1975–1982	5		Known as "The Vampire of Bytom" or "Frankenstein", who murdered five women between 1975 and 1982.
Colin Ireland	United Kingdom	1993	5		Called "The Gay Slayer". A highly organized serial killer, Ireland picked passive masochist gay men in the Coleherne public house, accompanied them home, and murdered them after they were voluntarily restrained. He then cleaned the house of forensic evidence and left when he was sure of not appearing suspicious.
Claude Lastennet	France	1993–1994	5		Convicted of murdering five elderly women between August 1993 and January 1994.
Metod Trobec	SR Slovenia	1976–1978	5		Raped, killed and cremated five women in his home. Also tried to murder two other immates while in prison before committing suicide in his cell in 2006.
Romulus Vereş	Romania	1970s	5		Known as "The Hammer Man". Institutionalized.
Akira Nishiguchi	Japan	1963	5		Fraudster, murdered two people while engaging in confidence scams and killed three others while on the run from justice. Hanged in 1970.
Boris Gusakov	Soviet Union	1964–1968	5		Known as "Student Hunter"; committed 15 sexual assaults, including five murders, on girls and young women from 1964 to 1968.
Anatoly Biryukov	Soviet Union	1977	5		Known as "The Hunter of Babies": responsible for the kidnappings and subsequent murders of five infants from Moscow in the fall of 1977.
Süleyman Aktaş	Turkey	1986–1994	5		Known as "The Nailing Killer": responsible for the murders of five people in 1986 and 1994.
B1 Butcher	Namibia	2005–2007	5		Murdered at least five women between 2005 and 2007, with all murders related to the National Road B1.
Jeffrey Daugherty	United States	1976	5		Murdered five people in both Florida and Pennsylvania. Executed in Florida in 1988.
Syvasky Poyner	United States	1984	5		Murdered five women in under two weeks in Newport News, Virginia.

== Serial killers with fewer than five proven victims ==
This part of the list contains serial killers with fewer than five proven victims who acted alone and were neither medical professionals nor contract killers. It excludes murderers with less than three proven victims, as their status as serial killers is uncertain (some such cases may be found below under § Disputed cases).

Name	Country	Years active	Proven victims	Possible victims	Notes
Alexander Spesivtsev	Russia	1991–1996	4	82+	Cannibal known as "The Novokuznetsk Monster"; admitted to 19 murders, but 82 bloody sets of clothes were found in his home, along with jewels and photographs of possibly unidentified victims. Found insane and interned in a mental hospital. His mother was sentenced to 16 years in prison for luring Spesivtsev's victims to their home.
Charlie Brandt	United States	1971–2004	4	29	Killed himself by hanging after murdering his wife and niece. The latter was also decapitated and eviscerated in a manner strongly similar to 26 unsolved murders of women in Florida, starting in 1973, the year Brandt moved to the state. Brandt was later considered the culprit in one of these murders, due to his strong resemblance to a suspect who was filmed by a traffic camera near the place where one body was found. He could not be officially tied to the other crimes due to lack of evidence. Previously, when he was 13 years old in 1971, he attempted to murder his whole family with a gun, for no apparent reason. His mother (who was pregnant) died in this attack, but his father survived, and his sister escaped.
Kurt-Werner Wichmann	West Germany	1989	4	21+	Cemetery gardener who was posthumously linked by DNA evidence to the infamous Göhrde Murders and the murder of Birgit Meier. Police suspect him in dozens of other unsolved disappearances.
Scott Lee Kimball	United States	2003–2004	4	21	A skilled forger who, while he ran a legitimate business buying and selling organic beef, primarily enriched himself by passing bad checks on the accounts of others and using forged documents; by 2003 he had faced criminal charges in four Western states. These white-collar crimes also enabled his murders, by allowing him to create evidence that his victims were still alive after he had killed them; he also used their checking accounts and credit cards to further his schemes once they were dead. For the first year of his murder activity, he worked as an informant for the FBI, which both paid him and protected him from facing justice over some of his fraud schemes.
Robert Black	United Kingdom; Ireland (suspected); West Germany (suspected); Netherlands (suspected); France (suspected)	1981–1986	4	18+	Convicted of kidnapping, raping and murdering four girls aged between five and 11. Suspect in other earlier child murders in the UK and other European countries. Died weeks before he was to be charged with a fifth child murder.
Max Gufler	Austria	1946–1958	4	18	Poisoned and drowned four women, but suspected of killing 18 in total.
Ernesto Picchioni	Italy	1949 and earlier	4	16	Murdered people who approached his home; died of cardiac arrest in 1967.
Baekuni	Indonesia	1993–2010	4	14	Child rapist who killed young boys; initially sentenced to life imprisonment, but changed to the death sentence.
Igor Chernat	USSR	1985–1986	4	13	Known as the "Evil Spirit of Kaukjarvi"; Ukrainian soldier who raped and killed women in Kamenka, selling their stolen items afterwards; executed 1987.
Mark Alan Smith	United States	1969–1970	4	12+	Convicted for murdering four women in Illinois and Arkansas in 1969–1970. He also confessed to killing up to eight women while serving as a soldier in West Germany from 1966 to 1969, though he later recanted several of these confessions and was never prosecuted for them. Suspected of involvement in further murders.
Ricky Lee Green	United States	1985–1986	4	12	Bisexual drifter who killed people he met in bars; his wife assisted in two of the murders; executed in 1997.
Robert Hicks Murray	United Kingdom	1912 and earlier	4	11+	Bigamist who murdered his wife and three children in a murder-suicide; posthumously revealed to have killed previous wives as well.
William Dean Christensen	United States; Canada	1982–1983	4	10+	Known as "The American Jack the Ripper"; murdered and mutilated three women and one man; Canadian and US authorities also investigated him as a suspect in 10 murders, but he died before any of these claims could be confirmed.
Angus Sinclair	United Kingdom	1961, 1967–1982	4	10	Scottish man who was originally convicted of murdering a seven-year-old girl when he was 16. As well as being convicted of the murders of three women in 1977 and 1978, police suspect he was responsible for four other murders of women in Glasgow in these years. Also a suspect in two other murders in 1970 and 1979 respectively.
John Cooper	United Kingdom	1985–1998	4	9	Psychopathic Welsh burglar who was convicted in 2011 of the double shotgun murders of a couple on the Pembrokeshire coast in 1989 and another during a botched burglary nearby in 1985. Police believed he killed at least one other woman in 1989, and investigated the possibility he could also have been responsible for another double shotgun murder in Bridgend in 1993. A forensic pathologist also claimed to police that he could have been responsible for two murders of elderly siblings in Pembrokeshire in 1976.
Cary Stayner	United States	1999	4	9	Known as "The Yosemite Killer". Killed four women in Yosemite, California. Sentenced to death. Brother of kidnapping victim Steven Stayner.
Émile Dubois	Chile; France (alleged); Colombia (alleged); Bolivia (alleged)	1905–1906	4	8	French immigrant who murdered and robbed four foreign businessmen between 1905 and 1906, in Santiago and Valparaíso. It is believed that he murdered four more people in France, Colombia, and Bolivia before arriving in Chile.
Tony Costa	United States	1968–1969	4	8	Dismembered and mutilated four women in Cape Cod in the late 1960s; linked to at least four other deaths and disappearances.
Carlton Gary	United States	1975–1978	4	8	Gary was convicted of raping and strangling three elderly women in Columbus, Georgia between 1977 and 1978, although police and prosecutors believe him to be responsible for up to seven rape-murders in Columbus. DNA also linked him to an additional murder in Syracuse, New York, but prosecutors did not charge him because he was already on death row.
Oakland County Child Killer	United States	1976–1977	4	7–11	Unidentified person or persons who abducted and murdered at least four children in Oakland County, Michigan, between 1976 and 1977.
Robert Rozier	United States	1981–1986	4	7	Former NFL player that was convicted of four murders but confessed to seven as a member of the Nation of Yahweh.
Leonard Fraser	Australia	1998–1999	4	7	Serial rapist and pedophile who murdered four women in Rockhampton. Sentenced to five consecutive life sentences plus 25 years without the possibility of parole; died in prison of a heart attack in 2007.
Christopher Peterson	United States	1990	4	7	Peterson was convicted of four fatal shootings by the so-called "Shotgun Killer" that occurred between October and December 1990. He was charged in three other murders related to the killing spree but was acquitted.
Ricardo Caputo	United States; Mexico	1971–1983	4	6	Was No. 1 of the FBI Ten Most Wanted Fugitives during his time as a fugitive in the 1980s. Surrendered himself to justice in 1994 and died of cardiac arrest in prison three years later.
Anthony Allen Shore	United States	1986–1995	4	5	Known as "The Tourniquet Killer"; convicted of strangling a woman with an unusual ligature in 1992 and confessed to killing three girls including two with same MO.
Daytona Beach killer	United States	2005–2007	4	5	Murdered four, possibly five women in Daytona Beach, Florida, between 2005 and 2007.
Jozef Slovák	Czechoslovakia	1978–1991	4	4+	Suspected by investigators of more murders, but only four could be proven.
Monster of Udine	Italy	1980–1989	4	4+	Killed at least four victims in the Province of Udine, Italy.
John Martin Crawford	Canada	1981–1992	4	4+	Convicted in 1996 for the murders of three native women.
Oba Chandler	United States	1989–1990	4	4+	Convicted for the June 1989 murders of Joan Rogers and her two daughters, whose bodies were found floating in Tampa Bay, Florida with their hands and feet bound. Autopsies showed the victims had been thrown into the water while still alive, with ropes tied to a concrete block around their necks. Chandler was executed in 2011. In February 2014, DNA evidence also identified Chandler as the murderer of Ivelisse Berrios-Beguerisse, who was found dead in Coral Springs, Florida, on 27 November 1990.
Dallen Bounds	United States	1999	4	4+	Murdered a Radio Shack manager and a florist at their respective places of business. Then murdered two acquaintances before taking two others hostage and committing suicide. Suspected of additional murders in the Pacific Northwest.
Wayne Adam Ford	United States	1997–1998	4	4+	Confessed to murdering four women; believed to have killed others.
Heinrich Pommerenke	West Germany	1959	4	4+	Killed four women.
Robert Mone	United Kingdom	1967–1976	4	4	Scottish man who shot dead a teacher at his former school in Dundee in 1967. Later escaped from a secure hospital in 1976 and killed three more.
Jerry Brudos	United States	1968–1969	4	4	Brudos was a necrophiliac who had a fascination with women's shoes, and would often dress his victims' corpses in women's clothing.
Robert Maudsley	United Kingdom	1974–1978	4	4	Sentenced to life without parole in 1974 for murdering a man who had shown him pictures of young boys he had sexually abused. Subsequently, killed another child sex offender in Broadmoor high-security hospital and two more, including a child sex offender, in prison. Has been held in solitary confinement since 1983.
Aalt Mondria	Netherlands	1978–1997	4	4	Dutch criminal and serial killer who committed four murders and was responsible for a large number of assaults. Mondria was considered extremely violent and aggressive. After a notorious murder of his girlfriend's 10-year-old son, he was sentenced to 18 years' imprisonment in 1998, after initially receiving life imprisonment for three murders in 1978, for which he also received 15 years' imprisonment.
Andrew Six	United States	1984–1987	4	4	Executed in Missouri in 1997 for the 1987 kidnapping and murder of a young girl. Posthumously linked to a 1984 triple murder in Iowa.
Tsutomu Miyazaki	Japan	1988–1989	4	4	Japanese man who murdered four young girls between August 1988 and June 1989 popularly known as the Otaku Killer. He was active in Tokyo and Saitama Prefecture.
Cody Legebokoff	Canada	2009–2010	4	4	Canadian serial killer convicted in 2014 by the British Columbia Supreme Court of murdering three women and one teenage girl, between 2009 and 2010, in or near the city of Prince George, British Columbia. He is one of Canada's youngest convicted serial killers.
Stephen Port	United Kingdom	2014–2015	4	4	Nicknamed "The Grindr Killer", Port met his victims via online gay social networks. He used gamma-Hydroxybutyric acid (GHB), a date rape drug, adding it to drinks given to his victims, raped them, and murdered four of them in his flat in Barking, east London.
Leo Boatman	United States	2006–2019	4	4	Killed two campers in 2006 and two prisoners between 2010 and 2019. Sentenced to death for the final murder.
Howell Donaldson III	United States	2017	4	4	Murdered four people in the Seminole Heights neighborhood of Tampa, Florida, in October and November 2017. All four victims were shot dead seemingly at random. Sentenced to four consecutive life sentences without parole in May 2023.
Arnold Sodeman	Australia	1930–1935	4	4	Sodeman was convicted of murdering four children between 1930 and 1935. He would abduct children, gag them and tie their hands behind their back with their own clothing and then strangle them. Sodeman was one of the last 11 people to be executed in Victoria.
Craig Price	United States	1987–1989	4	4	Murdered four people during violent attacks in their homes in Warwick, Rhode Island when he was a teenager.
Fritz Honka	West Germany	1970–1975	4	4	Strangled sex workers who refused to service him in the way that he wanted.
Jeremy Skibicki	Canada	2022	4	4	White supremacist who murdered Indigenous Canadian women and disposed of their bodies in garbage bags. Sentenced to life imprisonment in 2024.
Cayetano Santos Godino	Argentina	1912	4		Known as Petiso Orejudo ("the Big-eared Midget"). Teenage arsonist, animal killer and child murderer with congenital syphilis. Arrested at age 16 in 1912 for killing 4 children, although he tried to kill seven more, the first one when he was seven himself. Interned in 1913 in a reformatory, where he tried to kill other immates, and from 1915 in prison. Died in jail in 1948.
Eastbound Strangler	United States	2006	4		Killed four women in October and November 2006 in Atlantic City, NJ. Each was placed about 60 feet apart in a drainage ditch filled with shallow water. They were facing east and missing their socks.
Caroline Grills	Australia	1947–1953	4		Poisoned four people (most of them relatives) with thallium hidden in tea and scones she had given them in Sydney. Sentenced to five consecutive life sentences (including one for attempting to poison another family member); died from peritonitis in 1960.
Gordon Cummins	United Kingdom	1942	4		Raped three of his victims and robbed the remaining one. Also attacked two other women. Sentenced to death by hanging.
Marc Sappington	United States	2001	4		Schizophrenic serial killer who heard voices telling him to kill after extended daily PCP use. He cannibalized part of his last victim.
Peter Woodcock	Canada	1956–1991	4		Sexual sadist and child rapist. Killed three young children in Toronto in the 1950s. Sentenced to a psychiatric facility, where he murdered a fellow inmate in 1991.
Léopold Dion	Canada	1963	4		Known as the "Monster of Port-Rouge". Canadian sex offender and serial killer who was active in Quebec. Sentenced to hang but stabbed to death on 17 November 1972, by fellow inmate Normand "Lawrence d'Arabie" Champagne, who was found not guilty by reason of insanity.
John Ingvar Lövgren	Sweden	1958–1963	4		Confessed to four murders committed between 1958 and 1963 in the Stockholm region.
Lam Kor-wan	Hong Kong	1980s	4		Taxi driver and one of Hong Kong's only two known serial killers. Famous for keeping body parts in his parents' home.
Jürgen Bartsch	West Germany	1962–1966	4		Killed four, one escaped; died by wrongful overdose during castration surgery.
Wayne Boden	Canada	1968–1971	4		Known as "the Vampire Rapist" killed four women between 1968 and 1971; died in prison 2006.
Ion Rîmaru	Romania	1970–1971	4		Known as "The Vampire of Bucharest". Attacked 15 lone waitresses as they returned from work with a hammer, hatchet, knife or iron bar, always after midnight and under unusual weather (snowstorms, fog, hard rain, etc.). Four were killed.
David Meirhofer	United States	1967–1974	4		Killed three children and an ex-girlfriend between 1967 and 1974; first serial killer apprehended by offender profiling.
Thor Nis Christiansen	United States	1977–1979	4		Shot dead and committed necrophilia on four young women in Isla Vista, California in the late 1970s. Stabbed to death in prison on 30 March 1981; killer unknown.
Michael Lupo	United Kingdom	1986	4		Called himself "The Wolf Man". Murdered four men after being diagnosed with HIV, died in prison in 1995.
Peter Lundin	Denmark	1991–2000	4		Killed his mother in 1991, then killed his mistress and her two children nine years later. Sentenced to prison.
James Swann	United States	1993	4		Known as The Shotgun Stalker; killed four and injured five in Washington DC in 1993.
Steven Grieveson	United Kingdom	1993–1994	4		Murdered four boys in an attempt to conceal his homosexuality.
Frank Gust	Germany	1994–1998	4		Killed four women from 1994 to 1998. Sentenced to life imprisonment.
Alexander Tchayka	Russia	1994	4		All the victims were women wearing fur coats and were stabbed multiple times (21 in one case).
Peter Moore	United Kingdom	1995	4		Stabbed and mutilated four men. Imprisoned for life since 1996.
Hiroaki Hidaka	Japan	1996	4		Killed and robbed four women. Hanged in 2006.
Nicolai Bonner	Israel	2005	4		Born in Moldova, Bonner beat to death four fellow immigrants from the former Soviet Union, three of whom were homeless, and then tried to set them on fire. Sentenced to life imprisonment in 2007.
Raúl Osiel Marroquín	Mexico	2005	4		Called "The Sadist". Lured men in gay bars and strangled them, abandoning their bodies inside suitcases all over Mexico City. Two other victims were released after demanding a ransom from their families.
Viktor Karamarkov	North Macedonia	2009	4		Macedonian serial killer who murdered four elderly women in the nation's capital from March to October 2009.
Dale Cregan	United Kingdom	2012	4		
Richard Kuklinski	United States	1948–1986	3	100–250	
Harvey Miguel Robinson	United States	1992–1993	3	3	An American serial killer who murdered three women when he was only 18 years-old.
Albert Fish	United States	1924–1932	3	9–100+	American serial killer and child rapist who confessed to three murders for which he was convicted and sentenced to death.
Robert Ben Rhoades	United States	1989–1990	3	50+	Convicted of murdering three women in Texas and Illinois between 1989 and 1990. Sentenced to life imprisonment.
Peter Tobin	United Kingdom	1991–2006	3	48	Scottish rapist and serial killer known to have killed at least three young women. Was also previously a suspect in the Bible John murders committed in Glasgow during the late 1960s, although police have now dismissed the theory.
Pedro Padilla Flores	Mexico	1986	3	30	Killed three women in 1986; fled to the US but recaptured and deported back to Mexico; main suspect in the Ciudad Juárez Murders.
Stephen Morin	United States	1981	3	30	Convicted of murdering three women within a period of five weeks in 1981. Sentenced to death and executed.
Dorothea Puente	United States	1982–1988	3	9–25	Ran a boarding house in Sacramento where she poisoned tenants and buried them in the yard in order to steal their social security checks.
Ángel Díaz Balbín	Peru	1976–1986	3	20+	Balbín was convicted of three murders in 1976. Suspected of killing and dismembering more than 20 women in Lima, Peru, between 1985 and 1986. He was killed by psychologist Mario Poggi during an interrogation.
Billy Glaze	United States	1986–1987	3	20+	Known as "Butcher Knife Billy". Killer convicted of raping and murdering three Native American sex workers in Minneapolis in 1986 and 1987.
Sidney Cooke	United Kingdom	c. 1960–1989	3	20	Described by The Guardian newspaper in 1999 as "Britain's most notorious paedophile", Cooke and his infamous paedophile ring were convicted of the murder of 14-year-old Jason Swift in 1984. They were also known by police to have been responsible for the abductions and murders of children Barry Lewis and Mark Tildesley. Cooke was the ringleader of the gang, who are believed to have murdered up to 20 children, possibly including Vishal Mehrotra and Martin Allen.
Bertha Gifford	United States	1909–1928	3	17	Found not guilty by reason of insanity of three arsenic poisonings and suspected of 14 other killings, mostly children, in Missouri.
Bernhard Prigan	Allied-occupied Germany; West Germany	1947–1952	3	16	Killed women near highways; confessed to a total of 16 murders.
Ronald Janssen	Belgium	1990s–2010	3	15+	Sentenced to life imprisonment on October 21, 2011 for the murder of three people.
Patrick Mackay	United Kingdom	1973–1975	3	13	Burglar suspect of 12 violent murders during robberies, charged with five, convicted of three. The two other cases were left to lie on file, and proof was later found by police that he had killed one of these victims. Confessed to police that he had killed 13 people. Has been eligible for parole since 1995 and since 2017 has been held in an open prison with day release provisions. Now known as "David Groves".
Bruce Lindahl	United States	1974–1981	3	12+	Accidentally killed himself while stabbing one of his victims; posthumously connected to various rape-murders in Dupage County.
Koos Hertogs	Netherlands	1979–1980	3	12	Dutch serial killer convicted of abducting, torturing, raping and killing three girls. Suspected of killing a further three to nine girls and young women in the 1970s.
Michael Gargiulo	United States	1993–2008	3	10	Dubbed "The Hollywood Ripper", Gargiulo stabbed three women to death, and tried to kill a fourth woman. Sentenced to death in 2021 and still on death row.
Chisako Kakehi	Japan	2007–2013	3	10	Poisoned her husband and two other men to death, but suspected in another seven deaths; sentenced to death.
Heriberto Seda	United States	1990–1996	3	8+	Considered to be a copycat of the Zodiac Killer. Claimed to have killed people based on their zodiac signs, and only killed when certain star formations were out.
Anthony Hardy	United Kingdom	2002	3	8	Known as the "Camden Ripper", killed and dismembered three sex workers in Camden, London in 2002. Police believe he could be responsible for the murders of three other sex workers in London in the 1990s and two others in Nottinghamshire. One other unsolved murder he was linked to was solved in 2011 when her former partner John Sweeney was convicted of her murder.
Tracy Petrocelli	United States	1981–1982	3	8	Multi-state serial killer who was sentenced to death in Nevada (overturned), plus life imprisonment in both California and Washington.
Michael Lee Lockhart	United States	1987–1988	3	6+	Multi-state serial killer who received death sentences in three states (Florida, Indiana, and Texas). He was executed in 1997 in Texas.
Peter Dupas	Australia	1997–1999	3	6	Sexual sadist from Melbourne, who murdered three women and is suspected of at least three further killings. Was convicted of 16 separate acts of sexual violence before his first murder charge. Serving three consecutive life sentences without the possibility of parole.
Stephen Griffiths	United Kingdom	2009–2010	3	6	Known to have killed three sex workers, but claimed to police to have killed 6. Has been a suspect in one other murder. Dubbed himself the "Crossbow Cannibal" as he killed his victims with a hammer and crossbow and then later ate parts of them.
Levi Bellfield	United Kingdom	2002–2004	3	6	West London serial killer convicted of two fatal hammer attacks on women and the murder of Milly Dowler. Also a suspect in the murders of his childhood girlfriend Patsy Morris in 1980, Judith Gold, who was hit over the head in 1990, and Elizabeth Chau, who disappeared in 1999 and whose murder Bellfield has allegedly confessed to.
Hans van Zon	Netherlands	1967	3	5+	After the relationship between Hans van Zon and his girlfriend ended in April 1967, van Zon alleged that she continued to impose on him. To put an end to this, he went into her house and killed her with a self-made lead pipe. He also killed an 80-year-old shopkeeper and a milkman in robberies. In addition to the murders he was tried for, van Zon was also suspected of several other murders, including the lust murder of Elly Segov in 1964 and the murder of the English homosexual film director Claude Berkeley in 1965.
Judy Buenoano	United States	1971–1980	3	5	Poisoned her husband, boyfriend and son with arsenic; drowned the son in 1980 but caught in 1983 after poisoning and car bombing a fiancée.
Henry Eugene Hodges	United States	1988–1990	3	5	Convicted of both the 1989 murder of Barry McDonald and 1990 murder of Ronald Bassett in Tennessee, as well as the 1990 murder of Michael Whisnant in Georgia; sentenced to death for the murder of Bassett, and two life sentences for the murders of McDonald and Whisnant.
Martin Ney	Germany	1992–2004	3	5	Wore a mask while killing three and sexually assaulting at least 40 children.
Paul Denyer	Australia	1993	3	5	The "Frankston Killer", sentenced to three consecutive life sentences with a non-parole period of 30 years.
Bandali Debs	Australia	1997–1998	3	5	Convicted of the murder of Kirsty Harty at Upper Beaconsfield in 1997, and of the Moorabbin Police murders 14 months later to avoid arrest for a string of armed robberies; sentenced to three consecutive life sentences plus 27 years without the possibility of parole.
Peter Kudzinowski	United States	1924–1928	3	4	Convicted and executed for the murder of an adult in Scranton, Pennsylvania and two children in New Jersey. Also suspect in the death of two other children in New York City, although Albert Fish later confessed to have murdered one of them himself.
Harvey Glatman	United States	1957–1958	3	4	Known as "The Lonely Hearts Killer"; Californian rapist and killer; lured women to pose for "bondage photographs"; executed in the gas chamber on 18 September 1959.
Martha Ann Johnson	United States	1977–1982	3	4	Convicted of smothering three of her children in Atlanta between 1977 and 1982. Sentenced to life in prison on 5 May 1990.
Vlado Taneski	Republic of Macedonia	2005–2008	3	4	A crime journalist, Taneski came under suspicion when his articles on the rape and murder of three elderly women included information that had not been disclosed by the police. All the victims were poor, uneducated cleaners and knew Taneski's mother. Taneski killed himself in prison before he could be interrogated for the murder of a fourth woman.
Özkan Zengin	Turkey	2008	3	4	Slit the throats of three confirmed victims before dumping the bodies in wells. Reportedly confessed to an additional murder.
Khalil Wheeler-Weaver	United States	2016	3	4	American serial killer from Orange, New Jersey, Wheeler-Weaver lured his victims using dating apps and murdered three women and attempted to kill a fourth between August 2016 and November 2016. One of the victim's friends created a fake account and lured him to a meeting before notifying police.
William Henry Hance	United States	1977–1978	3	4	Hance murdered three women in and around military bases in the late 1970s. He attempted to blame two of the murders on white vigilantes outraged over a series of murders later attributed to Carlton Gary. Hance was also blamed for the murder of a fourth woman at Fort Benjamin Harrison in Indiana but was never brought to trial for this crime.
"Charlie Chop-off"	United States	1972–1973	3	4	Unidentified assailant who attacked young black and Puerto Rican boys and mutilated their genitals with a straight razor, killing three and leaving one castrated. Another suspected victim was killed but did not have his genitals mutilated. A single suspect was arrested for attempting to abduct another boy, confessed to one of the murders and was hesitantly identified by the surviving victim, but was found unfit for trial and may have been in a mental hospital during the murders.
François Vérove	France	1986–1994	3	3–9+	Nicknamed "Le Grêlé" ("the pockmarked man"), Verove a former police officer is blamed for four murders and a series of rapes since 1986. His confession was found on his suicide note alongside his body after he killed himself in 2021. The crimes include the 1986 murder of an 11-year-old child, Cécile Bloch, in Paris.
Louise Peete	United States	1912–1942	3	3+	Convicted of murdering a man and woman decades apart, four other acquaintances died suspiciously and four husbands committed suicide.
Westley Allan Dodd	United States	1989	3	3+	Dodd had an extensive arrest record for molesting children by the time his behavior escalated to include murder. Refusing to appeal his death sentence, he stated that he "should be punished to the full extent of the law, as should all sex offenders and murderers", and that if he ever escaped, he would immediately return to "killing and raping kids". Executed in 1993; his hanging was the first in the United States in 28 years.
Scott Erskine	United States	1989–1993	3	3+	Convicted of raping and murdering a woman in 1989 and the torture-murders of two boys in 1993. May be linked to other murders.
Donald Leroy Evans	United States	1985–1991	3	3+	Murdered a young girl and two women. Suspected of another dozen murders but recanted confessions to over 70 more. Stabbed to death by another death row inmate on 5 January 1999.
John Martin	United Kingdom	1995	3	3+	(Birth name John Martin Scripps, alias Simon James Davis) While on the run after escaping Britain, Martin killed at least three tourists between 8 and 14 March 1995 and robbed them of their possessions and money: one in Singapore and two in Thailand. He also dismembered their bodies and dumped them in various areas, such as the sea or abandoned places. Martin was also alleged to have killed at least three more people in other countries, such as the US, but these were unconfirmed. He was arrested in Changi Airport when he returned to Singapore on 19 March 1995, and was charged with murder. Martin was found guilty of the one murder he committed in Singapore and thus sentenced to death in November 1995. Martin was executed on 19 April 1996, after he declined to appeal against his sentence.
Richard Evonitz	United States	1996–1997	3	3+	Abducted and killed three girls in Spotsylvania County, Virginia in 1996 and 1997
Harvey Carignan	United States	1949–1974	3	3+	Serving a life sentence at the Minnesota Correctional Facility – Faribault for the murders of two women. He had been previously convicted for a 1949 rape and murder he committed while stationed in the U.S. Army, in Anchorage, Alaska.
John Joubert	United States	1982–1983	3	3+	Joubert killed a young boy in Maine and two boys in Nebraska. He was executed by the State of Nebraska in 1996.
Akku Yadav	India	2004 and earlier	3	3+	Murdered at least three people and dumped their bodies on the railroad tracks; lynched by a mob of around 200 women.
Michael Madison	United States	2012–2013	3	3+	American serial killer from East Cleveland, Ohio who committed at least three murders.
"Bible John"	United Kingdom	1968–1969	3	3	Unidentified serial killer who murdered three women in Glasgow, Scotland. Convicted serial killer Peter Tobin was suspected in the murders, but has since been eliminated as a suspect.
Andrew Dawson	United Kingdom	1982–2010	3	3	Killed an elderly man during a burglary in 1982. Following his release from prison, he stabbed two of his neighbors to death in separate incidents, describing himself as an "Angel of Mercy". He is currently Derby's only serial killer.
Leonarda Cianciulli	Italy	1939–1940	3	3	Murdered three women in the town of Correggio, Reggio Emilia, and turned their bodies into soap and cakes.
Sharon Kinne	United States	1960–1964	3	3	Sociopathic serial killer that murdered romantic partners with a handgun. Died in 2022.
Ted Kaczynski	United States	1978–1995	3	3	Domestic terrorist and serial bomber known as the "Unabomber", Kaczynski was responsible for more than two dozen bombings of universities and one airline bombing from 1978 to 1996, justified by Kaczynski by his philosophy that technological advancements would destroy humanity. Arrested in 1996 due to his brother David recognizing the then unidentified Unabomber's manifesto titled Industrial Society and Its Future as the work of Kaczynski. Died in prison on 10 June 2023.
Leon Dorsey	United States	1994	3	3	Murdered three people from 4 April – 1 September 1994. He was serving 60 years for the murder of an Ellis County convenience store employee when surveillance camera footage linked him to the murders of two other people. He was convicted and sentenced to death in June 2000 and executed on 12 August 2008.
Ronald Jebson	United Kingdom	1970–1974	3	3	Jebson, a prolific child molester, was convicted of raping and killing the eight-year-old daughter of acquaintances in 1974. While serving his sentence he pled guilty to molesting and murdering two other children, Susan Blatchford and Gary Hanlon, in 1970.
Charles Albanese	United States	1980–1981	3	3	Albanese poisoned his wife's mother and grandmother and his father with arsenic in order to obtain inheritance money, and unsuccessfully tried to poison his brother and mother. He was sentenced to death in two separate trials and ultimately executed in 1995.
Jason Thornburg	United States	2017–2021	3	2	Thornburg was convicted of three counts of capital murder for killing his roommate and two more women as part of religious sacrifices in Texas in September 2021, and even dismembered the bodies and cannibalise the victims' flesh. Thornburg was sentenced to death for the serial killings in December 2024, and he additionally confessed to killing his girlfriend in Arizona in 2017 and another roommate in May 2021 in Texas.
George Chapman	United Kingdom	1897–1902	3		Poisoned three consecutive mistresses with tartar emetic. Considered the possible identity of Jack the Ripper at the time of his execution (1903).
Martha Rendell	Australia	1907–1908	3		Killed three stepchildren with hydrochloric acid in the 20th century; last woman to be hanged in Western Australia.
George Joseph Smith	United Kingdom	1912–1914	3		Known as "The Brides in the Bath Murders"; killer of three women. Executed by hanging on 13 August 1915.
Daisy de Melker	South Africa	1923–1932	3		Poisoner; killed two husbands and one son from 1923 to 1932.
Eddie Leonski	Australia	1942	3		Confessed to three murders after being picked out of a line of American servicemen by witnesses. Sentenced to death and hanged.
William Heirens	United States	1945–1946	3		Burglar who stabbed three females between. Known as "The Lipstick Killer".
John Straffen	United Kingdom	1951–1952	3		Killed his third victim after escaping from the mental hospital where he was recluded for the first two murders. Longest-held prisoner in modern British history at the time of his death in 2007.
Richard Laurence Marquette	United States	1961–1975	3		First 11th name on FBI 10 Most Wanted for killing, mutilating and dismembering a woman in 1961; killed two more with same MO upon 1973 release.
Graham Young	United Kingdom	1962–1971	3		Called the "Teacup Poisoner". Poisoned over 70 people, three of whom died.
Charles Schmid	United States	1964–1965	3		Known as "The Pied Piper of Tucson"; murdered three teenage girls in 1964 and 1965 and buried them in the desert.
Lee Roy Martin	United States	1967–1968	3		Known as "The Gaffney Strangler"; killed two women and two girls in South Carolina in 1967 and 1968.
Erwin Hagedorn	East Germany	1969–1971	3		Killed three boys ages nine to 12. Was convicted and executed in 1972.
Karl F. Warner	United States	1969–1971	3		Convicted of murdering three teenage girls, in two separate incidents, in the San Francisco Bay Area communities of San Jose and Saratoga, he was briefly suspected of being the notorious Zodiac Killer, but was soon ruled out as a suspect in that case.
Howard Arthur Allen	United States	1974–1987	3		Killed three elderly people, as well as assault, burglary, and arson. Sentenced to death 11 June 1988.
Trevor Hardy	United Kingdom	1974–1976	3		Called "The Monster of Manchester". Died in prison in 2012.
Steven David Catlin	United States	1976–1984	3		Poisoned three people from 1976 to 1984. Sentenced to death in 1990.
Paul Michael Stephani	United States	1980–1982	3		Known as "The Weepy-Voiced Killer"; would call police and ask for help after murders. Killed three women in the cities of Saint Paul and Minneapolis, Minnesota.
Dámaso Rodríguez Martín	Spain	1981–1991	3		Serial rapist and voyeur known as "The Warlock". After being sentenced to 55 years for murdering a man and raping his girlfriend in 1981, he escaped from prison in 1991 and fled to the Anaga mountains in Tenerife, where he killed a German hiking couple (the woman was also raped). Cornered in an abandoned house, Martín shot himself unsuccessfully and was then shot dead by law enforcement.
Altemio Sanchez	United States	1981–2006	3		Known as "The Bike Path Rapist" for murdering three women and raping at least 14 others in and around the Buffalo, New York area. Sentenced to 75 years in prison without the possibility of parole.
Gregory Brazel	Australia	1982–1990	3		Shot dead a woman in 1982 armed robbery and murdered two sex workers in 1990.
Brian Dugan	United States	1983–1985	3		Convicted of murdering two girls and a woman between 1983 and 1985.
Demorris Hunter	United States	1985–2002	3		Killed three people between 1985 and 2002. Sentenced to death in Florida.
Valery Asratyan	Soviet Union	1988–1990	3		Raped dozens of women in Moscow, murdering three. Executed.
Francisca Ballesteros	Spain	1990–2004	3		"The Black Widow of Valencia". Poisoned her husband and three children, one of whom survived. Sentenced to 85 years in prison in 2005.
Silvo Plut	SFR Yugoslavia; Serbia and Montenegro; Slovenia	1990–2006	3		After serving 13 years in prison in Slovenia for a rape and murder, Plut murdered a second woman in Serbia in 2004 and fled back to Slovenia, where a Serbian petition of extradition was turned down by the government. Plut was then arrested for attacking a couple (wife died, husband survived) and sentenced to 30 years in prison. Committed suicide in 2007.
Scott Lehr	United States	1991–1992	3		Killed and raped three women between 1991 and 1992. Sentenced to death.
Gabriel Garza Hoth	Mexico	1991–1998	3		Known as "The Black Widower", killed 3 women between 1991 and 1998, his victims were wives and lovers.
Robert Napper	United Kingdom	1992–1993	3		Rapist and murderer who mutilated one of his victims so badly that the policeman who found her was put into therapy for two years. Suspected of up to 70 violent sexual attacks in South East London attributed to the unidentified "Green Chain Rapist".
Antonis Daglis	Greece	1992–1995	3		"The Athens Ripper". A serial rapist with antecedents for violence, Daglis upgraded to raping, strangling and dismembering three sex workers with a hacksaw in 1992, and tried to kill six more women. In his trial he claimed to hate all sex workers. Killed himself in prison in 1997.
Gustavo Romero Tercero	Spain	1993–1998	3		"The Valdepeñas Killer". Armed robber and rapist, he killed a couple after the woman recognized him in 1993, and another woman in 1998 after accidentally hitting her with his car, fearing that a possible investigation would link him to the other crimes. Confessed and was sentenced to 83 years in prison for all crimes in 2003, after his ex-wife denounced him.
Peter Bryan	United Kingdom	1993–2004	3		A paranoid schizophrenic, Bryan was recluded in a mental institution after killing a shop assistant with a hammer in 1993. Released 11 years later after psychiatrists noted his "continued improvement", Bryan immediately killed a friend and was apprehended when he was frying his brains on a pan. Months later, Bryan killed a fellow mental patient, declaring that he didn't eat him solely because he was caught first. Currently imprisoned for life.
Lam Kwok-wai	Hong Kong	1993	3		Convicted of 10 rapes and three murders that he committed with his bare hands. One of two only known serial killers in Hong Kong.
Dana Sue Gray	United States	1994	3		Convicted of murder of three elderly women and attempted murder of a fourth in California.
Robin Ligus	United Kingdom	1994	3		Died in a mental institution in 2012.
Jack Owen Spillman	United States	1994–1995	3		Known as "The Werewolf Butcher"; killed two girls and the mother of one of them in Washington State in 1994 and 1995.
Scott Williams	United States	1997–2006	3		Killed and mutilated three women between 1997 and 2006. Sentenced to life.
Juan Covington	United States	1998–2005	3		Shot and killed three people.
Matthew James Harris	Australia	1998	3		Strangled a friend's brother, a female friend and a male neighbour over five weeks in 1998 in Wagga Wagga.
Yukio Yamaji	Japan	2000–2005	3		Murdered his own mother in 2000, and then murdered a 27-year-old woman and her 19-year-old sister in 2005.
Hiroshi Maeue	Japan	2005	3		Called the "Suicide Website Murderer" for finding his victims in an online suicide community. Maeue offered to painlessly kill themselves together by charcoal burning in a car, but once together he strangled them with his bare hands instead, as this excited him sexually. Hanged in 2009.
António Luís Costa	Portugal	2005–2006	3		Ex-soldier, suffocated three women (and mutilated the first one) in Santa Comba Dao.
Özgür Dengiz	Turkey	2007	3		Known as "The Cannibal of Ankara" for eating one of his victims; a third victim survived. Interned in a mental institution after his conviction to two life sentences was overturned.
Mario Alberto Sulú Canché	Mexico	2007–2008	3		Killed 3 women from 2007 to 2008; later committing suicide by hanging in prison.
Joanna Dennehy	United Kingdom	2013	3		Carried out the Peterborough ditch murders. Over a period of two weeks, murdered her landlord and two of her house mates by stabbing them. With the help of accomplices she dumped the bodies in ditches, then attempted to kill two strangers in broad daylight by stabbing them. Given whole life tariff on 28 February 2014.
Kimberly McCarthy	United States	1988–1997	3		Executed for murdering her neighbour, 71-year-old Dorothy Booth; DNA evidence proved she had murdered two other elderly women, but she was never charged.
Bennie Demps	United States	1971–1976	3		Executed in 2000 for the 1976 murder of fellow prisoner Alfred Sturgis while serving a double life sentence for the 1971 Eustis Car Trunk double murder.
Jeffrey Motts	United States	1995–2005	3		Executed in 2011 for the 2005 murder of his cellmate Charles Martin while serving a double life sentence for the 1995 killings of his great aunt and a male relative.
Richard Beasley	United States	2011	3		Known as the Craigslist Killer; killed three men with the enticement of fake job offers.
David Burgess	United Kingdom	1966—1967	3		Stabbed and strangled three young girls in Beenham over a two-year period.

== Medical professionals and pseudo-medical professionals ==
Name	Country	Years active	Proven victims	Possible victims	Notes
Harold Shipman	United Kingdom	1975–1998	218	250	Convicted of 15 murders and found to be responsible for the deaths of 218 patients identified by inquiry, but is believed to have killed around 250 people. He injected diamorphine into his patients and then falsified the medical records, reporting that his patient had been in poor health. Hanged himself in prison in 2004.
Niels Högel	Germany	1999–2005	85+	300	Nurse who was sentenced to life imprisonment for the murder of more than 85 people. In November 2017, German prosecutors said that the number of victims was at least 106, with Högel admitting, in October 2018, to murdering 100 patients. By May 2019, he was believed to be the most prolific serial killer in peacetime Germany with up to 300 victims over 15 years.
Baba Anujka	Kingdom of Yugoslavia	c. 1890s–1928	50	150	Anujka was an accomplished amateur chemist from the village of Vladimirovac, Yugoslavia (modern day Serbia). She poisoned at least 50 people and possibly as many as 150 in the late 19th and early 20th centuries. Was sentenced to 15 years in prison in 1929 but released after eight years due to old age.
Louay Omar Mohammed al-Taei	Iraq	2005–2006	43		Medical doctor found to have killed 43 wounded policemen, soldiers and officials in Kirkuk; was a member of an insurgent cell.
Donald Harvey	United States	1970–1987	37	57–87	Self-professed Angel of Death. Worked as an orderly in Cincinnati-area hospitals and preyed on his patients. Claimed to have killed 87 patients starting at age 18. Active 1970–1987. Sentenced to 28 life sentences in Ohio.
Jane Toppan	United States	1885–1901	31		Nurse that confessed to poisoning 31 patients. Found not guilty by reason of insanity and interned in a mental institution until her death in 1938.
Charles Cullen	United States	1988–2003	29	400+	Nurse in New Jersey and Pennsylvania who murdered at least 29 patients between 1988 and 2003, but experts believe the number could be as high as 400. Cullen has admitted to more murders, which authorities believe are likely, but the murders cannot be verified due to lack of records.
Stephan Letter	Germany	2003–2004	29	29+	Nurse who killed 29 patients; sentenced to life imprisonment in 2006.
Anders Hansson	Sweden	1978–1979	27		A nurse aide who poisoned victims with gevisol and ivisol. His actions were called "The Hospital Murders" (Swedish: Sjukhusmorden).
Marcel Petiot	France	1926–1944	26	63	Active 1926 and from 1942 to 1944. Petiot is suspected of having killed up to 63 in total. Executed in 1946.
Arnfinn Nesset	Norway	1983 and earlier	22	27–138+	Norwegian nurse and most prolific known serial killer in Scandinavian history, convicted in 1983 of poisoning at least 22 patients with Curacit. He initially confessed to 27 murders; later he retracted his confessions and claimed he had killed 138 patients. He was released from prison in 2004 after serving 21 years, the maximum punishment possible by Norwegian law.
Roger Andermatt	Switzerland	1995–2001	22	22	Known as the "Death Nurse of Lucerne"; nurse who killed 22 patients. Most prolific Swiss serial killer in history. Sentenced to life imprisonment.
Linda Hazzard	United States	1908–1912	15	17	Quack doctor and swindler who manipulated her patients into fasting until they starved themselves to death. 17 deaths were attributed to this practice, with evidence of 15 being presented at her trial. She was pardoned after serving two years' imprisonment with hard labour and later starved herself to death attempting her own fasting cure.
Maxim Petrov	Russia	2000–2002	12	19	Doctor who killed his patients in St. Petersburg. Suspected of 19 murders.
Frédéric Péchier	France	2008–2017	12	12	Anesthesiologist who killed several patients by contaminating their infusion bags with chemicals to trigger a fatal cardiac arrest. He would often attempt to save his victims in order to be regarded as a saviour by his colleagues. It is believed that Péchier may have intended to discredit colleagues whom he bore grudges against by causing cardiac arrests in their patients.
Joan Vila Dilmé	Spain	2009–2010	11	15	Nursing home worker who fatally poisoned 11 elderly residents or more in Olot. In the trial he claimed they were mercy kills intended to spare the victims of further suffering, although three of them were administered caustic cleaning materials that caused severe burns and a long agony.
Vickie Dawn Jackson	United States	2000–2001	10	20	Vocational nurse at Nocona General Hospital who murdered patients who irritated her with injections of Mivacron. She was convicted of 10 murders, although law enforcement suspected her in around 20 suspicious deaths.
Ann Arbor Hospital Killer	United States	1975	10	10	Poisonings of 10 patients at the Veteran's Administration Hospital in 1975. Filipino nurses Filipina Narciso and Leonora Perez were tried for the crimes.
Ludivine Chambet	France	2012–2013	10	10	Known as "The Poisoner of Chambéry"; nurse's aide who poisoned elderly patients; sentenced to 25 years' imprisonment.
Frederick Mors	United States	1914–1915	8	8+	Born Carl Menarik, Austrian who killed eight elderly patients by poisoning in New York. Sent to an asylum and escaped. Never caught.
Elizabeth Wettlaufer	Canada	2007–2016	8	8	Confessed to murdering eight senior citizens and attempting to murder six others in southwestern Ontario. With a total of 14 victims either killed or injured by her actions, she is described as one of the worst serial killers in Canadian history.
Petr Zelenka	Czech Republic	2006	7	21	Killed his victims with a lethal injection of heparin from May to September 2006. Ten people survived his murder attempt. Suspected of up to 14 additional murders.
Marianne Nölle	West Germany; Germany	1984–1992	7	17	Nurse who was convicted of killing seven patients between 1984 and 1992; suspected of killing 17; sentenced to life imprisonment in 1993.
Lucy Letby	United Kingdom	2015–2016	7	7	Nurse convicted of murdering seven babies and attempting to murder another six while working at Countess of Chester Hospital in Chester, England. Following her conviction, a number of doubts about the reliability of the evidence have been raised, with Letby continuing to maintain her innocence.
Orville Lynn Majors	United States	1993–1995	6	130	Licensed practical nurse in Vermillion County, Indiana. Preyed on elderly patients—thought to have killed many of them with injections of potassium chloride. Sentenced to 360 years in Indiana.
Efren Saldivar	United States	1989–1997	6	50+	Respiratory therapist who killed six patients, possibly as many as 120.
Christine Malèvre	France	1998 and earlier	6	30	Nurse who killed terminally ill patients claiming that they had asked her to help them die, something denied by their families. Sentenced to 12 years in prison for six murders and suspect of 30.
Antoinette Scieri	France	1924–1925	6	12+	Nurse who poisoned her elderly patients. Death sentence was commuted to life in prison and she died in prison.
Milka Pavlović	Kingdom of Yugoslavia	March–July 1934	6		Peasant woman who poisoned family members, relatives and servants with arsenic between March and July 1934, succeeding in killing six and wounding ten others so she could acquire their inheritance. After being convicted of the crimes, she was sentenced to death and subsequently executed.
Ahmad Ahmadi	Imperial State of Iran	1931–1944	6		Responsible for killing political prisoners at Qasr prison during the reign of Reza Shah.
Brenda Agüero	Argentina	March–June 2022	5		Agüero was convicted in June 2025 of the murders of five babies whom she poisoned with either insulin or potassium. Sentenced to life imprisonment.
Kristen Gilbert	United States	1990–1996	5	70+	Nurse at a Veterans Medical Center in Massachusetts who injected male patients with epinephrine, causing heart attacks. Sentenced to life without parole.
Frans Hooijmaijers	Netherlands	1970–1975	5	259	Nurse who was convicted for killing five patients at a hospital in Kerkrade, the Netherlands from 1970 to 1975, but was suspected to have killed approximately 259 people.
Amy Archer-Gilligan	United States	1910–1917	5	48+	A nursing home proprietor believed to have poisoned as many as 60 patients from her homes and her second husband. Charged with five murders originally, this was lowered to just one following her admission of guilt, and was found guilty of second-degree murder. Died in a mental hospital in 1962.
Sonya Caleffi	Italy	2003–2004	5	18	Nurse who poisoned terminally ill patients; sentenced to 20 years' imprisonment.
Aino Nykopp-Koski	Finland	2004–2009	5		Nurse who killed five elderly patients using sedatives and opiates in Finland.
Kimberly Clark Saenz	United States	2008	5		Killed five patients by using syringes to inject bleach into their dialysis lines.
Kermit Gosnell	United States	1989?–2010	4+	200+	Kermit Gosnell ran a non-compliant abortion clinic that also served as a pill mill. Authorities investigating the clinic discovered the remains of at least 47 late-term victims stored in bags or cartons, some of which appeared to have been killed after birth. He was convicted in 2011 for three counts of first-degree murder of babies whom he delivered alive and then severed their spinal cords, one count of manslaughter for the death of a woman he performed an abortion on, and over 200 counts of other abortion-related crimes. Testimony indicated hundreds of similar procedures carried out by Gosnell and his staff.
Edson Izidoro Guimarães	Brazil	1999 and earlier	4	131	Nurse who injected patients with potassium chloride or removed their oxygen mask. Confessed to five murders which he claimed to be mercy killings and was convicted of four in 2000; sentenced to 76 years in prison. He may have killed as many as 131 patients for money, as he was paid $60 for informing local funeral homes of a patient's death so that they could contact the deceased's relatives first.
Michael Swango	United States; Zimbabwe	1981–1997	4	35–60+	Medical doctor who killed patients.
Richard Angelo	United States	1987	4	25	Known as "The Angel of Death". New York nurse convicted of four murders, linked to six other deaths. Suspected of killing up to 25 people.
Colin Norris	United Kingdom	2002	4	18	Convicted of murdering four elderly women and attempting to murder another in two Leeds hospitals during 2002 while working as a nurse. He had injected the women, who were only in hospital due to broken hips, with massive overdoses of insulin. He was sentenced to life imprisonment with a minimum term of 30 years in 2008.
Beverley Allitt	United Kingdom	1991	4		Convicted of murdering four children and attacking another nine in the Lincolnshire hospital where she worked as a nurse. Sentenced to life with a minimum term of 30 years.
Andrés Ulises Castillo Villarreal	Mexico	2009–2015	3	12+	Known as "The Chihuahua Ripper"; drugged, raped and then killed men in Chihuahua; sentenced to 120 years' imprisonment.
Elfriede Blauensteiner	Austria	1981–1995	3	10+	Known as "The Black Widow"; poisoned people for material gain; died from a brain tumor in 2003.

== Serial killer groups and couples ==
Name	Country	Years active	Proven victims	Possible victims	Notes
Philadelphia poison ring	United States	1931–1938	114		Gang of 16 that poisoned Italian immigrants with arsenic in order to collect their life insurance. The leaders, cousins Herman and Paul Petrillo, were executed in the electric chair in 1941 while the rest were given life sentences.
Abboud and Khajawa	Iraq	?–1917	100+		Married couple who resorted to cannibalism during a famine in Mosul. They would use their young son to lure children into their home before beating them to death, dismembering them and eating their remains or serving them to members of the public at their restaurant. They also killed and ate one adult neighbour but found that her body contained too much fat.
Javed Iqbal and three teenagers	Pakistan	1998–1999	100		Child-murderer and rapist, known as "Kukri", Iqbal confessed to raping and murdering 100 boys between the ages of six and sixteen years with three teen agers. Iqbal strangled the victims and covered up his crimes by dissolving the bodies in acid. He was arrested in December 1999 after sending a letter to a newspaper. Iqbal and 17-year-old accomplice Sajid Ahmed was Sentenced to death, set to be executed in the manner described by the judge, who stated, "You will be strangled to death in front of the parents whose children you killed" and, "Your body will then be cut into 100 pieces and put in acid, the same way you killed the children." However, Iqbal and Ahumed died in custody, in an apparent suicide by hanging, before he could be executed. 15-year-old accomplice Mamad Nadeem is a sentenced to 182 year imprisonment, 13-year-old accomplice Mamad Sabir is a 63 year imprisonment.
Delfina and María de Jesús González	Mexico	1955–1964	91+		Two sisters who ran a brothel in Mexico, hired numerous sex workers and murdered at least 80 of them after they were deemed useless during the span of 10 years. They also killed 11 men. Probably the work of four of the sisters, sentenced to 40 years in prison. Body count varies due to the combined work of the sisters being impossible to assign to them individually.
Peng Miaoji, Ding Yunjia and Su Xiaoping	China	1998–1999	77	84	Fleeing to Shaanxi, Jiangsu, Anhui, and Henan provinces and 21 provinces and cities 33 administrative villages; during 38 burglaries, killed 77 people, seriously injured three others.
Hassan Orangi and Abbas Ali Zarifian	Iran	1945–1951	62		Raped and murdered 62 women in Mashhad from 1945 to 1951. After his arrest, Orangi was tried, convicted, sentenced to death and later executed, while Zarifian was sentenced to 15 years for his role in the crimes.
Angel Makers of Nagyrév	Hungary	1911–1929	50	300+	26 women who poisoned their husbands (sometimes also their parents, lovers and children) with arsenic under the guidance of midwife Júlia Fazekas and her accomplice, Susi Oláh.
Long Zhimin and Yan Shuxia	China	1983–1985	48	48+	Shaanxi Province Wang Shou villagers Long Zhimin and Yan Shuxia killed 48 people.
Ryno-Skachevsky gang	Russia	2006–2007	37		Racist skinhead gang, led by Artur Ryno and Pavel Skachevsky, who killed people from non-European ethnicities or backgrounds; both sentenced to 10 years of penal labour.
Ramadan Abdel Rehim Mansour and Farag Samir Mahmoud	Egypt	1999–2006	32	32+	Mansour was a street gang leader known as "al-Tourbini" ("The Express Train"). He had raped and tortured homeless children with gang member Farag Samir Mahmoud known as "Hatana", mostly boys aged 10 to 14 years old, aboard the trains between Cairo, Alexandria, Qalyubia, and Beni Sueif. The victims were usually thrown off the moving train when they were dead or in agony; other times, they were thrown into the Nile or buried alive. Mansour and Mahmoud was executed in 2010.
Gang of Amazons	Russia	2003–2013	30		Family of robbers and serial killers, led by the parents Inessa Tarverdiyeva and Roman Podkopaev.
Dean Corll, David Owen Brooks and Elmer Wayne Henley	United States	1970–1973	29	48+	Corll, known as the "Candy Man", along with his two teenage accomplices David Owen Brooks and Elmer Wayne Henley, sexually assaulted, tortured, and murdered at least 29 teenage boys and young men picked up from the Houston Heights area between 1970 and 1973, though Corll claimed to have committed earlier murders in California before meeting Brooks or Henley. Henley shot and killed Corll on August 8, 1973, in what was later deemed self-defense before turning himself in and confessing the trio's crimes.
Borman Gang	Kazakhstan	1998–2000	29	29+	Gang of drug addicts and alcoholics led by Alexander Suvorov who raped, tortured and murdered at least 29 people in Almaty from 1998 to 2000; two members died before trial, while the rest were incarcerated.
Brabant killers	Belgium; France	1982–1985	28	40+	Gang made up by at least three extremely violent robbers, none of whom was ever identified or apprehended. Their bloodlust increased dramatically in their last year of activity, when they began shooting passersby before a robbery, including children, for no seeming reason. Some have theorized links to Operation Gladio.
Zhang Jun and three gangstars	China	1993–2000	28		Gang led by Zhang Jun who robbed and killed 28 people. In most cases, Li Zejun, Chen Shiqing and Zhao Zhenghong assisted him. All four were executed.
Adolfo Constanzo and Sara Aldrete	Mexico	1986–1989	25+		"The Godparents of Matamoros". Leader and second-in-command of a drug-smuggling cult that abducted men to perform human sacrifices.
Shankill Butchers	United Kingdom	1975–1982	23	23+	Ulster Loyalist gang led by Lenny Murphy, who killed people in sectarian attacks.
Viktor Sayenko and Igor Suprunyuk	Ukraine	2007	21		"The Dnepropetrovsk Maniacs". A pair of 19-year-olds who, over the course of less than a month, attacked and murdered passersby while out on walks. They recorded videos of some of the murders, including one which subsequently leaked to the Internet.
Ripper Crew	United States	1981–1982	18		Abducted women, mostly sex workers, then raped, tortured and killed them in Chicago, Illinois.
John Allen Muhammad and Lee Boyd Malvo	United States	2002	17		Killed 17 people from February to September 2002 and 10 in the Beltway sniper attacks of October 2002. Muhammad was executed in 2009, while Malvo received life imprisonment.
Death Angels	United States	1973–1974	16	73	Four African-Americans who killed at least 16 white people and injured between eight and 10 in San Francisco (Zebra murders).
Vladyslav Volkovich and Volodymyr Kondratenko	Ukraine	1991–1997	16	20+	"The Nighttime Killers". Murdered homeless men and lone drivers with a variety of weapons.
Lainz Angels of Death	Austria	1983–1989	15	49–200+	Known as the "Lainz Angels of Death"; Waltraud Wagner, Irene Leidolf, Stephanija Mayer, and Maria Gruber were nurses at the Lainz General Hospital in Vienna who admitted to murdering 49 patients.
The Cleaners	Russia	2014–2015	15	15+	Neo-Nazi gang, led by Pavel Voitov and Elena Lobacheva, who murdered alcoholic tramps and beggars; Voitov sentenced to life imprisonment and Lobacheva to 13 years in a penal colony.
José Miculax Bux and Mariano Macú Miculax	Guatemala	1946	15		Cousins who killed 15 boys in 1946.
William Bonin and Vernon Butts	United States	1979–1980	14	21–36+	William Bonin, Vernon Butts and two accomplices murdered at least 14 youths aged between 12 and 19 in and around Los Angeles. As the majority of his victims were discarded alongside various southern California freeways, Bonin became known as the Freeway Killer. He was executed by lethal injection in 1996. Vernon Butts committed suicide after his arrest.
Lê Thanh Vân and Dìu Dãnh Quang	Vietnam	1998–2001	13	16+	Couple who poisoned at least 13 people to death with cyanide for financial gain.
Fred West and Rosemary West	United Kingdom	1967–1987	12	30	Mainly targeted young women but were also found guilty of murdering two of their own daughters. Also found guilty of raping another daughter. Buried the victims around their house and local area of Gloucester. Shortly before he killed himself in 1995, Fred West said there were more victims. At one point he confessed to killing up to 30.
Briley Brothers	United States	1971–1979	12		Three brothers and an accomplice responsible for 12 murders in the 1970s in Richmond, Virginia.
John Justin Bunting, Robert Joe Wagner and James Spyridon Vlassakis	Australia	1992–1999	12		The bodies of eight victims were found in plastic barrels in a disused bank vault in Snowtown, South Australia. Bunting was found guilty of 11 murders, Wagner pleaded guilty to three and was convicted of a further seven murders.
Mailoni Brothers	Zambia	2007–2013	12		Three brothers who killed at least 12 people from 2007 to 2013. Killed by Zambia Army Commandos in 2013.
Leonard Lake and Charles Ng	United States	1982–1985	11	25	Abducted women, used them as sex slaves, and then murdered them, together with any men, women, and children who got in their way. Lake killed himself upon arrest, but Ng was later convicted of killing 11 people. Between 1982 and 1985, Lake and Ng were believed to have abducted and killed as many as 25 victims, as evidenced by human remains found on Lake's California ranch.
Bloody Benders	United States	1871–1873	11	20	The Bender family, more well known as the Bloody Benders, were a family of serial killers in Labette County, Kansas, United States, from May 1871 to December 1872. Estimates report that the Benders killed at least a dozen travelers, and perhaps as many as 20 before they were discovered. The family's fate remains unknown, with theories ranging from a lynching to a successful escape.
Cheng Ruilong and Lan Qirong	China	1996–2005	11	13	Cheng Ruilong committed a robbery with Lan Qirong and two accomplices. After fleeing, he killed at least 11 people alongside Lan before being arrested in 2005.
Shen brothers and Li Chunling	China	1999–2004	11		Shen brothers killed eleven sex workers with four sex workers. In most cases, Li Chunling assisted him.Shen and Li was executed in 2006.
Polatbay Berdaliyev and Abduseit Ormanov	Uzbekistan; Kazakhstan	2011–2012	11		Raped, robbed and murdered women along desolate roads; both sentenced to life imprisonment in both countries.
Wolfgang Abel and Marco Furlan	Italy; West Germany; Netherlands	1977–1984	10	27	The victims, seemingly chosen at random and killed by different methods, were found next to letters written in Italian, signed "Ludwig" and containing Nazi imagery, that gave a reason for why the murder had been committed. Abel and Furlan were arrested in Castiglione delle Stiviere while dousing a crowded discothèque with gasoline and sentenced in 1987 to 30 years in prison for all crimes (later reduced to 27).
Juan Carlos Hernández and Patricia Martínez	Mexico	2012–2018	10	20	Known as the "Monsters of Ecatepec"; couple who raped, murdered and cannibalized women.
Hillside Stranglers	United States	1977–1979	10	10	Initially believed to be one person, two perpetrators were eventually discovered to be cousins Kenneth Bianchi and Angelo Buono Jr. Convicted of kidnapping, raping, torturing and murdering 10 women and girls ranging in age from 12 to 28.
Joshi-Abhyankar serial murderers	India	1976–1977	10		Four Pune commercial art students (Rajendra Jakkal, Dilip Sutar, Shantaram Kanhoji Jagtap and Munawar Harun Shah) that broke into random people's homes and businesses and strangled them with a nylon rope. Executed by hanging in 1983.
Gerald and Charlene Gallego	United States	1978–1980	10		Killed 10 victims in Sacramento, California. Gerald Gallego died of cancer before his death sentence could be carried out. Charlene Gallego was released July 1997.
Viña del Mar psychopaths	Chile	1980–1981	10		Jorge Sagredo and Carlos Topp committed 10 murders and four rapes from 5 August 1980 – 1 November 1981 in the city of Viña del Mar. Executed by firing squad in 1985, they became the last people executed in Chile.
Wang Zongfang and Wang Zongwei	China	1983	10		Brothers who murdered civilians, police officers, and soldiers in five different shootings in three cities over the course of seven months while on the run for robbery. Killed during a shootout with an armed search team at a mountain near the Fujian–Jiangxi border.
Yevgeny Nagorny and Sergei Stavitsky	Russia	1998	10		Killed clients with expensive cars in their auto shop in order to sell the cars; sentenced to life imprisonment.
National Socialist Underground	Germany	2000–2007	10		Neo-Nazi group who killed 10 ethnic Turks in the Bosphorus serial murders from 2000 to 2007. Most victims were small business owners killed in broad daylight with a gunshot to the face. Two of the suspects killed themselves and a third, Beate Zschäpe, was apprehended in 2011.
The Manson Family cult killings	United States	1967–1969	9	21―35	A California desert cult formed by Charles Manson in 1967, the 'Manson Family' committed a series of murders in name of promoting Manson's goal of causing a race war that he called Helter Skelter.
Song Jinghua and Yan Jinguang	China	2005–2007	9	9	Robbed and killed women in Beijing out of revenge for Song's brother, who was previously executed for an unrelated crime.
Simon Majola and Themba Nkosi	South Africa	2000–2001	8	21+	Murdered least eight people in the vicinity of the Bruma Lake in Bruma, Gauteng.
Tadeusz Grzesik and the Bureaucrats Gang	Poland	1991–2007	8	20+	Robbed and killed people in several Polish voivodeships, mainly owners of exchange offices.
Edgar Álvarez Cruz and Francisco Granados	Mexico	1993–2003	8–10	14+	Kidnapped, drugged, raped and then killed women in cotton fields.
Michel Fourniret and Monique Olivier	France; Belgium	1987–2003	8	12+	Known as the Ogre or Beast of Ardennes; Michel Fourniret was raped and murdered least eight people with wife Monique Olivier. Michel was sentenced to life and died of respiratory problems while in prison in 2021.
Piranha Family	Japan	1984–2012	8	11–15+	Women-led eight-member gang of pseudo-family who collectively abused, tortured, and murdered at least eight people. Two of the eight members were Korean. Gang leader Miyoko Sumida committed suicide before the trial. One of the korean members, Lee Masanori, was sentenced to life imprisonment. The other six members were sentenced to imprisonment.
The Ciudad Juárez Rebels	Mexico	1995–1996	8	10–14	Gang of serial killers, led by Sergio Armendáriz Diaz and Juan Contreras Jurado, who killed women in Ciudad Juárez; claimed to work for Abdul Latif Sharif.
Szczepan and Józefa Paśnik	Russia; Poland	1900s–1922	8	8+	After killing a prison guard and escaping from prison in Russia, Szczepan Paśnik raped and murdered at least seven women with the help of his wife, Józefa.
Alton Coleman and Debra Brown	America	1984	8		Couple who murdered eight people in six states.
Zakrzewski family	Poland	1954–1969	8		Serial killer family who robbed and killed eight people. Józef and Czesław Zakrzewski was sentenced to death and executed in 1972, and Adam Zakrzewski was sentenced to 25 year imprisonment.
The Hernández Brothers Sect	Mexico	1963	8		Originally a scam intended to extort money and sexual favors from the poor, illiterate inhabitants of the small village of Yerba Buena, who were promised favors from "Inca gods" in the mountains, the cult came to include Aztec-inspired human sacrifices after prostitute Magdalena Solís took over as high priestess. 15 people were sentenced to 30 years in prison for their participation in the ritual murders of seven villagers and one police officer.
Rudolfo Infante and Anna Villeda	Mexico	1991	8		Responsible for eight murders.
Dale Hausner and Samuel Dieteman	United States	2006	8		Known as the "Serial Shooter". Responsible for eight murders in random drive-by shootings in 2006 in Phoenix, Arizona.
Aleksey Sukletin and Madina Shakirova	Soviet Union	1979–1985	7	20+	Known as "The Alligator"; Aleksey Sukleti killed and cannibalized at least seven girls and women with wife Madina Shakirova from 1979 to 1985; Sukleti was executed 1987. Shakiroya was received a 15-year prison sentence.
Futoshi Matsunaga and Junko Ogata	Japan	1996–1998	7	9	Matsunaga and Ogata tortured and killed seven people who Matsunaga held prisoner through blackmail, six of whom were members of the Ogata family. Matsunaga was also investigated in the death of a woman he defrauded and one of her children but no evidence was found to prove he had murdered them.
Red Light District Orderlies	Kazakhstan	1998–1999	7	7+	Gang of serial killers and cannibals who raped, robbed, and murdered at least seven prostitutes, then cooked and ate some of their bodies.
Li Pingping and Dong Meirong	China	1995–2003	7	7	Li Pingping killed seven people, In most cases, wife Dong Meirong assisted him. Li was sentenced to death and executed in 2004 while Dong received a 15-year prison sentence.
Paul Ruiz and Earl Van Denton	United States	1977	7	7	Responsible for seven murders in Oklahoma, Louisiana and Arkansas. Sentenced to death and executed in Arkansas for two killings.
Christopher Worrell and James Miller	Australia	1976–1977	7	7	Known as the "Truro Murderers"; Worrell was killed in a car accident and the killings stopped. Later Miller was convicted of killing seven people in 1976–1977.
Fa Ziying and Lao Rongzhi	China	1996–1999	7	7	A pair of Chinese serial killers. The two met in 1993 and later became lovers. The prosecution accused them of kidnapping, robbery, and murder in Nanchang, Wenzhou, and Hefei from 1996 to 1999. A total of seven people were killed. Ziying was arrested on 23 July 1999 in Hefei and subsequently sentenced to death, deprived of political rights for life, and fined by the Hefei Intermediate People's Court. On 28 December 1999, Ziying was executed by being shot.
Igor Churasov and Gennady Shurmanov	Russia	1997–2000	7	7	Churasov killed seven people, dissected their corpses, and cooked and ate parts of their flesh and organs. In most cases, Shurmanov assisted him.
Johannes van Rooyen and Dumisani Makhubela	South Africa	2005	7	7	Two South African men who raped, robbed and murdered multiple victims, including a family of four. Sentenced to four centuries in prison after a two-year trial.
Auto Shankar's Gang	India	1988–1989	6	9	Nine men who collaborated to abduct and murder at least six teenage girls in Chennai; their bodies were cremated and thrown into the sea or buried under residential homes. Leader Auto Shankar and two accomplices were sentenced to death by hanging in 1991, his brother Auto Mohan to three consecutive life sentences in prison and five other collaborators to six months in prison.
Gert van Rooyen and Joey Haarhof	South Africa	1988–1989	6	8	Their victims were never found; the pair shot dead a police officer and then committed suicide when faced with arrest after the escape of their last kidnap victim.
Peng Chang and Shao Xiaodan	China	1988–1995	6	6	Killed six people and fed their bodies to dogs. Both of them were sentenced to death and execution by shooting.
Sachiko Eto and three followers	Japan	1994–1995	6	6	Cult leader and followers who lynched and murdered six members of her cult.
Kiss brothers and Zsolt István Pető	Hungary	2008–2009	6	6	A series of murders perpetrated by three Neo-Nazis (with an accomplice István Csaba Csontos) against people of Roma ethnicity, occurring between July 2008 and August 2009. It is regarded as one of the worst crimes in the country's history after the war.
Hermann Duft and Hans Wilhelm Bassenauer	Greece	1969	6		German serial killers who murdered six persons in Greece, within a short period in 1969, were captured, tried, sentenced to death and executed.
David Alan Gore and Fred Waterfield	United States	1981–1983	6		Cousins connected to the murders of six females. Gore was executed in 2012 and Waterfield was sentenced to life imprisonment.
Artyom Alexandrovich Anoufriev and Nikita Vakhtangovich Lytkin	Russia	2010–2011	6		Teenaged thrill-killers of random people.
The Skin Hunters	Poland	1998-2002	5	1200+	Hospital crew that killed patients in order to get bribes from nearby funeral homes. Two doctors and two paramedics were convicted for the murder of five patients, but there are suspicions that more were involved. Due to the heavy use of pancuronium bromide, scoline and potassium chloride in 1998–2001, the actual number of victims could be as high as 1200.
Miyuki and Takeshi Ishikawa	Japan	1946–1948	5	84+	Killed 84 newborn children at maximum. As a midwife, she together with husband Takeshi killed infants born to parents unwilling to care for them during the prohibition of abortion in Japan.
Desmond Domnique Jennings and John H. Freeman	United States	1993	5	20	Robber duo who killed at least five people in drug-related robberies in Fort Worth, Texas in 1993.
Ray and Faye Copeland	United States	1986–1989	5	12	Oldest couple ever sentenced to death in the United States at the ages of 75 and 69; convicted of killing five men; modus operandi was to hire unskilled drifters as farmhands and later kill them.
Ian Brady and Myra Hindley	United Kingdom	1963–1965	5	12	Responsible for the "Moors murders"; they abducted, raped, tortured and murdered at least five children in the Manchester area before burying their victims on Saddleworth Moor as part of an experiment in "existential experience". The case attracted much media coverage long after the two were sentenced, especially in the United Kingdom, as Hindley sought release from prison from the 1980s but was refused and died in prison. Five victims were identified although Brady periodically claimed that there were up to 12.
Zdravko Petrov and Plamen Radkov	Bulgaria	1998–1999	5	5+	Robber duo who robbed, raped, and murdered at least five people in Ruse.
Sala gang	Sweden	1930–1936	5	5	Also known as " The Magic Circle" five-member gang led by Sigvard Thurneman, who committed the robbed and murdered five people.
Chen Chin-hsing, Lin Chun-sheng and Kao Tien-meen	Taiwan	1997	5	5	Robber and rapeint gang who robbed, raped and killed five people. Lin and Kao was committed suicide to avoid arrest. Chen was sentenced to death and executed in 1999.
Lawrence Bittaker and Roy Norris	United States	1979	5	5	The "Toolbox Killers"; they kidnapped, raped, tortured and murdered five female hitchhikers in southern California over a five-month period in 1979.
"The Family"	Australia	1979–1983	5		An alleged group of up to 12 Australian men, believed to include unspecified high-profile figures, responsible for the abduction, torture and murder of five Australian teenagers and young adults who died from being sodomized with blunt instruments. One member of the group, Bevan Spencer von Einem, was convicted of the final murder, but police believe more unidentified people to have been involved in the crimes. The group has also been linked to upwards of 150 sexual assaults and rapes against teenage boys.
James Gregory Marlow and Cynthia Coffman	United States	1986	5		Killed four women and one man in 1986.
Gwendolyn Graham and Catherine May Wood	United States	1987	5		Nurses who killed five elderly women in Grand Rapids, Michigan.
Chijon family	South Korea	1993	5		South Korean gang of cannibals that was sentenced to death for killing five people.
Loren Herzog and Wesley Shermantine	United States	1984–1999	4	19	Known as the "Speed Freak Killers"; California duo initially convicted of four murders from 1984 to 1999.
Gen Sekine and Hiroko Kazama	Japan	1993	4	7–30+	Pet breeder couple who poisoned four customers to death and dismembered their bodies to destroy evidence.
Archibald Hall and Michael Kitto	United Kingdom	1977–1977	4	5	Archibald Hall murdered four people together with Michael Kitto.
Steven Dean Gordon and Franc Cano	United States	2013–2014	4	5	Killed at least four sex workers in Santa Ana and Anaheim, California
David and Catherine Birnie	Australia	1986	4	4–8	Australian couple who raped and murdered four women in their home and attempted to murder a fifth in Perth in 1986. Both were sentenced to four consecutive life sentences without the possibility of parole; David Birnie hanged himself in prison on 7 October 2005.
Mikhail Zaika and Evgeny Kondrashov	Russia	1997–1999	4	4+	Satanist duo in St. Petersburg who killed at least four people in ritual attacks. Kondrashov was sentenced to 24 years and released in 2023 after serving his full term. Zaika, found insane, was held in compulsory psychiatric treatment until his release in 2020.
Valentinas Laskys and Renata Laskytė	Lithuania	1990–1992	4		Valentinas Laskys robbed and murdered four people with his daughter Renata Laskytė.
Aladár Donászi and László Bene	Hungary	1991–1992	4	4	Aladár Donászi met László Bene while serving a prison sentence; after his release, he reunited with Bene, and together they conspired to kill four people.
John Duffy and David Mulcahy	United Kingdom	1985–86	3	100+	Known as the "Railway Rapists". Duffy and Mulcahy stalked and raped women near train stations in London, killing at least three of the victims. Duffy was found guilty in 1988 of two murders and four rapes. He later confessed to another murder and implicated Mulcahy in his crimes, leading to his conviction. After Mulcahy's trial, the police announced that they were investigating possible links between the two men and hundreds of unsolved rape and murder cases.
Northcott family and Sanford Clark	United States	1926–1928	3	20+	Pedophile who abducted and murdered boys aged between 10 and 12 in Los Angeles and then disposed of the bodies with the help of his mother, Sarah Louise Northcott, and his underage nephew Sanford Clark, whom Northcott had repeatedly threatened and sexually abused. Police considered Northcott a suspect in the disappearance of as many as 20 missing boys in the area that Northcott admitted to have molested, but not murdered; one of these boys surfaced years later alive and confirmed Northcott's version. According to Clark, only four boys were held and murdered in Northcott's property; the three LA children whose remains were found and for whom Northcott was hanged, and an unidentified Mexican boy that Northcott beheaded and disposed of the body near La Puente, California.
Raymond Fernandez and Martha Beck	United States	1947–1949	3	20	Known as the "Lonely Hearts Killers", Fernandez and Beck extorted women Fernandez met through lonely hearts advertisements. Both were arrested in Michigan in 1949 for the murders of a woman and her two-year-old daughter, but Michigan authorities waived prosecution and extradited the pair to New York to face trial for a murder that occurred there because New York had the death penalty while Michigan did not. They were convicted of that murder and executed in 1951.
Beasts of Satan	Italy	1998–2004	3	18	Cult members responsible for ritualistic murders, and are suspected in other cases, including suicides.
James Paster and Stephen McCoy	United States	1980–1981	3	5	Texas duo convicted of three murders from 1980 to 1981, and both subsequently executed. Shortly before his execution Paster confessed to having committed two additional murders.
Paul Bernardo and Karla Homolka	Canada	1990–1992	3	5	Bernardo, a serial rapist, and his girlfriend Homolka were responsible for the murders of three teenage girls, including Homolka's sister Tammy Homolka, who were kidnapped and raped by Bernardo before being killed by Bernardo and Homolka. Homolka received a light sentence in return for testifying against Bernardo as part of a controversial plea bargain; it was proved after the bargain that her involvement in the murders was greater than previously believed. Bernardo has also been suggested as a suspect in a 1991 death with similarities to his modus operandi, and is the prime suspect in the 1990 disappearance and probable murder of Elizabeth Bain, which her boyfriend Robert Baltovich was wrongly convicted of before being exonerated in 2008.
Michael Bear Carson and Suzan Carson	United States	1981–1983	3	3+	Nomadic hippie killers involved in the counter-culture movement; sentenced to life imprisonment for three San Francisco Bay Area murders in 1983.
Shinichi Shimoyama and Wong Yee sun	Japan	1993	3		Gang leader Shinichi Shimoyama killed three people. In most cases, Chinese-Malaysian Wong Yee sun assisted him.
Richard Beasley and Brogan Rafferty	United States	2011	3		Richard Beasley murdered three people in ohio alongside his teenage accomplice, Brogan Rafferty.
Joseph and Michael Kallinger	United States	1974–1975	3		Joseph Kallinger murdered three people and tortured four families with his 13-year-old son Michael in New Jersey.
Silvia Merez Cult	Mexico	2009–2012	3		Ritually murdered three people in sacrifices to Santa Muerte.
Haley Brothers	America	1984	2	8	Kevin Bernard Haley was murdered least two people with his older brother Reginald.
Raya and Sakina and their husbands	Egypt	1919–1920	2	Unknown	Gang of four that rented a house for women and killed them to rob their money and jewellery. Raya and Sakina were the first women executed in the modern state of Egypt, in 1921.
Amelia Sach and Annie Walters	United Kingdom	1900–1903	1 (Note: Other victims are known to have been killed but only one case was brought to trial.)	300+	Sach and Walters, known as the "Finchley baby farmers", would take in unwanted babies from young women, collect a fee and then discreetly murder the children. They were executed in 1903, the only double hanging of women in British history.

== Disputed cases ==
This list includes persons convicted as serial killers whose guilt is doubted by serious sources, as well as some particularly prominent cases of suspected serial killers for whom less than three murders could be definitively proven.

Name	Country	Years active	Proven victims	Possible victims	Notes
"Highway of Tears" Killer	Canada	1980–present	18	83	All the victims were young women and were last seen on Highway 16 in British Columbia between Prince George and Prince Rupert. If they were all victims of the same person, it would be one of the most prolific serial killers in Canada and one with the longest career in the world. Some of the murders have been linked to American criminal Bobby Jack Fowler, although he was in prison at the time others were committed.
Orlando Sabino	Brazil	1966?–1971?	12		Suspected of murdering 12 people in Minas Gerais and Goiás, as well as mutilating several animals; sentenced to 38 years' imprisonment and died from a heart attack in 2013. Conspiracy theorists allege that the victims were killed by the military government, which framed Sabino.
Charles Quansah	Ghana	1993–2001	8	34	Quansah, who had been in prison for rape twice, was held as a suspect in the deaths of 34 women across the country, including his girlfriend who was strangled in 2000, and eventually confessed to eight murders. He later denied the killings, claiming that the confessions had been extracted under torture, and that the police had also tried unsuccessfully to force him to implicate a number of politicians including former president Jerry Rawlings, his wife Nana Konadu Agyeman and an unidentified member of President John Kufuor's administration.
Redhead murders	United States	1978–1992	8+		Series of unsolved homicides believed to have been committed by an unidentified serial killer in Tennessee, Arkansas, Kentucky, Mississippi and Pennsylvania.
Jeff Davis 8	United States	2005–2009	8		The bodies of eight women, all of whom had an involvement with drugs or prostitution, were found in swamps and canals surrounding Jennings, Louisiana. Originally thought to be a serial killer, but multiple suspects may be involved.
Pedro Rosa da Conceição	Brazil	1904–1911	5	17	Brazilian mass murderer who killed three people and wounded 13 others on 22 April 1904. Killed his cellmate and a guard in 1911, and is said to have murdered a family of 12 people in an unspecified date and year. Died in 1919. The family murders are not verified.
Earl Bramblett	United States	1977–1994	4	6	Mass murderer who murdered four members of the Hodges family in their home in Vinton, Virginia in August 1994. He was a suspect in the 1977 disappearances of Tammy Akers and Angela Rader, who were both 14 years old and worked for him at the time, but not enough evidence to charge him was found before his execution for the Hodges murders in 2003.
Henry Lee Lucas	United States	1960–1983	3	600+	Confessed to killing 3,000 and later 600 people but later recanted and is suspected of lying about a majority of the murders. He originally offered a list of 77 women from 19 different states, but as he confessed to more and more murders, the details became increasingly more bizarre. Some included dismemberment, necrophilia, even cannibalism. Lawmen linked Lucas and Ottis Toole to 81 murders only. Convicted of 11 murders. The true number of murders committed by Lucas is unknown, but it is likely Lucas was not nearly as prolific a serial killer as he initially claimed to be, as most of his murder confessions were thoroughly discredited, and he himself claimed only one murder—that of his mother.
"Bowraville Murders" Killer	Australia	1990–1991	3		Proposed serial killer responsible of the murders of three Aboriginal children in the same area, all bludgeoned to death. Thomas Jay Hart was tried for one of the murders and acquitted, and held as a suspect in another for which he did not face prosecution.
Billy Gohl	United States	1901–1913	2	40–140+	Alleged to have killed from 40 to 140 seamen in Aberdeen, Washington
Christopher Halliwell	United Kingdom	1985–2011	2	28–60	Halliwell pleaded guilty in 2012 to abducting and murdering Sian O'Callaghan the previous year. He also confessed to the 2003 murder of Becky Godden-Edwards, but his confession was ruled inadmissible and he could not be convicted until 2016, when new evidence was found. Halliwell is a person of interest in 26 other murders, and a collection of articles of women's clothing which included some taken from his victims may link him to up to 60 murders.
Larry Hall	United States	1980–1994	2	50+	Hall traveled around the American Midwest as part of his interest in historical reenactments, which he would also use as a cover for stalking, raping, and murdering teenage girls. It is believed his first murders were committed when he was 18 years old. Although he was convicted of kidnapping 15-year-old Jessica Roach, Hall has never been charged with murder. Authorities have tied 15 murders to Hall, though only been able to confirm two, he has admitted to (and recanted) committing 39, though the FBI believes he could have committed as many as 50 in at least three states.
Alejandro Máynez	Mexico	1980s–1990s	2	50+	Killed at least two women in Ciudad Juárez, but believed to be 50. Supposedly, along with Ana Benavides and Melchor Máynez.
Kieran Patrick Kelly	United Kingdom	c. 1953–1983	2	31	Irish vagrant who operated in London, England. He was convicted of two murders but confessed to many more, claiming he used a variety of methods from pushing people in front of trains to setting them on fire to poisoning them, and said he had been murdering for a period of some 30 years. In 2015 former detective George Platt published a book about Kelly claiming he could be responsible for 31 murders, prompting the chief of the Metropolitan Police Bernard Hogan Howe to promise a re-investigation into his crimes. However, in 2019 Irish journalist Robert Mullhern published a book raising serious questions about Platt's claims, concluding that Kelly was only responsible for five or six murders.
Wayne Williams	United States	1979–1981	2	24–31	Believed to have perpetrated the Atlanta murders of 1979–1981. After being convicted of two murders and sentenced to life imprisonment, authorities closed 22 other unsolved murders, declaring Williams to have been the perpetrator. Williams has maintained his innocence and the case was reopened in 2005.
Gerard John Schaefer	United States	1969–1973	2	30+	Florida police officer who killed up to 34 women and girls. Stabbed to death by fellow inmate Vincent Faustino Rivera on 3 December 1995.
Billy Chemirmir	United States	2016–2018	2	22–24+	Sentenced to life imprisonment for the final murder in 2022. 11 additional indictments were dropped after conviction. Killed by a cellmate on 19 September 2023.
Allan Grimson	United Kingdom	1986–1998	2	22	Homosexual Royal Navy sailor Grimson was convicted of the partially sexually motivated murders of two other (non-homosexual) Royal Navy sailors while docked in Portsmouth on 12 December 1997 and 12 December 1998. Strongly suspected of being responsible for up to 20 other murders across different navy bases of the world, including in Gibraltar and New Zealand. Also the prime suspect in the disappearance of fellow Royal Navy sailor Simon Parkes from Gibraltar in 1986, in part because he disappeared on 12 December, the date on which Grimson killed his other victims, and because Grimson was docked in Gibraltar with the navy at this time. Grimson's 2001 trial judge told him that he was "a serial killer in nature if not in number".
Billy Edwin Reid	United States	1989	2	21	Reid was arrested in 2006 after a successful DNA profiling test proved his responsibility in the murders of two sex workers in 1989 in Denver, Colorado. It is thought he might have been responsible for many murders, including some from the Denver Prostitute Killer – an unidentified single, or multiple serial killers responsible 17–27 murders between 1975 and 1995.
Joe Ball	United States	1937–1938	2	20	Bootlegger and barman known as the "Butcher of Elmendorf", the "Bluebeard of South Texas", and "the Alligator Man" because of the alligator pit he had in the back of his bar and where he entertained clients by throwing live animals to the reptiles. Ball killed two barmaids but he shot himself fatally in the chest when police came to question him and was never arrested or interrogated. Yellow press and pulp magazines later exaggerated his exploits, claiming that he had killed up to 20 women and fed them to the alligators, but this was never proven and caused some of Ball's relatives to sue such publications. Police investigated about a dozen missing women who had worked at Ball's place; some were found alive in San Antonio, but others could not be accounted for.
Alun Kyte	United Kingdom	1984–1997	2	12	Kyte was found guilty of raping and murdering two sex workers in 1993 and 1994. He reportedly boasted to fellow inmates while serving time on a rape charge that he had killed a total of 12 women and police have linked him to a number of unsolved murders of women although he has been ruled out in many cases in which he was initially suspected.
Larry Gene Bell	United States	1975–1985	2	5	Bell abducted and killed two women, Shari Smith and Debra Helmick, in May and June 1985. He was also a suspect in the disappearances of Denise Porch, Sandee Cornett and Beth Hagen. Bell was executed for murdering Smith and Helmick in 1996.
Michael Stone	United Kingdom	1976–1996	2	4	Stone, who was convicted of the 1996 double murder of Lin and Megan Russell, is suspected of two other murders. His conviction is controversial and his legal team blame confirmed serial killer Levi Bellfield for the 1996 murders, although members of Stone's family believe he committed one additional murder.
David Smith	United Kingdom	1988–1999	2	4	Smith was jailed for life in 1999 for murdering prostitute Amanda Walker. It was widely reported that he had previously been acquitted of the "almost identical" murder of another prostitute, Sarah Crump. Smith's acquittal was overturned in 2023 and he was found guilty of murdering Crump after he bragged to fellow inmates about how he had "got away with it". Smith is also suspected of murdering two other women prior to his initial conviction.
James Otto Earhart	United States	1981–1987	2	3	Earhart murdered Virginia Freeman in Brazos County, Texas on 1 December 1981. He also murdered nine-year-old Kandy Kirtland in 1987, and was executed for the murder in 1999. Posthumous DNA testing later proved that he was responsible for Freeman's murder, and he is also suspected of killing another woman in 1986.
Jeffrey Willis	United States	1996–2014	2	3	Willis was convicted of the 2013 murder of Jessica Heeringa, whose body was never found, and of the 2014 murder of Rebekah Bletsch. Both women had had their photos included in a file on Willis' computer labelled "vics" (short for victims). Willis is also a person of interest in the unsolved murder of Angela Thornburg in 1996.
Ángel Nieves Díaz	United States; Puerto Rico	1978–1979	2	3	Díaz was convicted of killing a store clerk in a robbery in Miami in 1979, having escaped from prison in Puerto Rico the previous year after being convicted of murdering another man. Police also suspected him of involvement in a third murder committed while he was on the run.
Pam Hupp	United States	2011–2016	1–2	3	Hupp is the prime suspect in the 2011 murder of cancer patient Betsy Faria, who was stabbed to death shortly after making Hupp the sole beneficiary of a sizable life insurance policy. Faria's husband Russ was wrongfully convicted of her murder but was exonerated in 2015 and mobile data placed Hupp at the scene of the crime. After Russ was released, Hupp murdered a man named Louis Gumpenberger in 2016 and attempted to frame Russ for hiring him to kill her, but was caught and sentenced to life imprisonment for the murder. Hupp is currently awaiting trial for the murder of Betsy Faria, and is also suspected of having murdered her mother Shirley Neumann for inheritance in 2013.
Johann Otto Hoch	United States; Austria (alleged); France (alleged); United Kingdom (alleged)	1888–1905	1	50+	Swindler who married several women under different aliases, most of whom died after a few months; others disappeared without a trace. Convicted of one murder by poisoning and hanged.
Clementine Barnabet	United States	1911	1	35	Barnabet was convicted of one murder but confessed as a total of 35. She was believed to have murdered entire families in their sleep, but doubt has been cast on the extent of her involvement. Sentenced to life imprisonment but released in 1923.
Jessie McTavish	United Kingdom	1974	1 (Note: McTavish was convicted of the murder in 1974, but later acquitted on appeal in 1975 on a technicality.)	24	British nurse who was convicted in 1974 of the murder of a patient with insulin after being inspired by the plot of A Man Called Ironside. She was released on appeal in 1975, despite three appeal court judges saying there was ample evidence to support the conviction, as the trial judge had inadvertently misled the jury in his final summary. The appeal court judges said that it was an omission that "a few words could have cured". Apart from the case prosecuted, another 23 cases were deemed suspicious by investigators. Although acquitted, McTavish's case often is mentioned in lectures at medical colleges in Britain, and is cited in textbooks and academic papers about forensic science and medical malpractice. McTavish, now known as Jessie Gordon, is believed to have been the inspiration for serial killer nurse Colin Norris.
Bobby Jack Fowler	United States; Canada	1969–1996	1	20	One murder proven, suspected of up to 20 more. Suspect in the Highway of Tears murders.
Abdul Latif Sharif	Mexico	1995	1	18–20	Egyptian chemist known as "The Jackal of Ciudad Juárez". After migrating to the United States in the 1970s, Sharif served 14 years in prison for several rapes but fled to Mexico when he was about to be deported to his home country. There, he was accused of up to 20 of the female homicides in Ciudad Juárez but was convicted of only one, to 30 years in prison, where he died of natural causes in 2006. As the high rate of female murders has continued to this day in Ciudad Juárez, it has been claimed that Sharif was used as a scapegoat by the Mexican police.
Leszek Pękalski	Poland	1984–1992	1	17	Called "The Vampire of Bytów". Charged with 17 murders but convicted of only one (to 25 years in prison) for faulty collection of evidence. During the investigation he admitted to killing 80 people but later retracted his confession.
Daisuke Mori	Japan	2000 and earlier	1	11+	Nurse that was sentenced to life imprisonment for one murder but suspected of killing at least 10 others. He might have confessed to some of the murders in order to protect others.
Thomas Henry McMonigle	United States	1945 and before	1	11	McMonigle was executed in 1948 for the murder of Thora Afton Chamberlain three years before, having admitted to shooting her and throwing her off a cliff after trying to rape her. While awaiting execution he claimed to have committed 11 murders, but these claims could not be verified.
Bevan Spencer von Einem	Australia	1979–1983	1	10	Arrested for three and convicted of one of "The Family Murders", where four teenagers and one young adult, all male, were drugged, kidnapped, raped and mutilated for several weeks before their bodies were abandoned in the countryside near Adelaide. Police believed that von Einem had several accomplices, none of whom was publicly identified or detained, and at the time of his trial it was widely reported that the murders had been committed by a group of four to 12 high-profile Australian men; von Einem himself claimed to be the victim of a conspiracy. He has also been considered a suspect in the disappearance of two girls near the Adelaide Oval in 1973 and the high-profile Beaumont children disappearance in 1966.
Paul Bateson	United States	1975–1977	1	10	Bateson, known for his involvement in The Exorcist, stabbed film journalist Addison Verrill to death after having sex with him in 1977. While imprisoned for the murder he allegedly bragged about committing the "bag murders", a series of murders of six gay men in New York City who were dismembered and dumped in the Hudson River, and supposedly admitted three other murders to an acquaintance prior to Verrill's murder. However he was never charged with any crimes apart from Verrill's murder due to lack of evidence.
Derek Percy	Australia	1965–1969	1	9	Percy abducted and murdered 12-year-old Yvonne Tuohy in 1969 and was remanded indefinitely after being found mentally unfit for trial. A wider investigation found that his movements around the country and physical description linked him to multiple unsolved murders and disappearances of children, including the Wanda Beach Murders in 1965, the Beaumont children disappearance and the murder of Allen Redston in 1966 and two other unsolved cases in 1968; Percy himself claimed to be unable to remember if he had killed anybody else.
Robert Durst	United States	1971–2001	1	3–6	Durst was a suspect in the 1982 disappearance of his wife Kathleen McCormack, who vanished after arguing with Durst. He murdered his longtime friend Susan Berman, who had provided him with an alibi for the disappearance, in 2000, and in 2001 killed and dismembered a neighbour named Morris Black but was acquitted on grounds of self-defense. He was convicted of murdering Susan Berman in 2021 and was also charged with the murder of Kathleen McCormack, but died before he could stand trial for that crime. Durst was also investigated as a suspect in the 1971 disappearance of Lynne Schulze and the disappearances of Karen Mitchell and Kristen Modafferi in 1997.
Brian Field	United Kingdom	1968–1996	1	5	Field raped and murdered 13-year-old Roy Tutill in 1968, but was not convicted until 2001, in the interim serving time in prison for sex offences against children. He is the prime suspect in the disappearance of Patrick Warren and David Spencer in 1996, and a person of interest in the 1985 disappearance of Lee Boxell and the murder of another child, Mark Billington, in 1984.
Lowell Amos	United States	1979?–1994	1	4	Detroit businessman sentenced to life imprisonment in 1996 for the murder of his third wife. Suspected of, but never charged with the deaths of two previous wives and his mother, all of whom died under suspicious circumstances and left life insurance policies to Amos that, at least in one case, Amos himself had bought against the will of the insured.
Charles Albright	United States	1990–1991	1	3	Albright was convicted of the 1991 murder of prostitute Shirley Williams, who was shot twice in the head and had her eyeballs removed by the killer. He was accused of two similar murders of sex workers but was not convicted.
John Cannan	United Kingdom	1986–1987	1	3	Cannan, a serial rapist, is serving a life sentence for the 1987 kidnap, rape and murder of Shirley Banks. Police have also named Cannan as the prime suspect in the disappearance of Suzy Lamplugh and the murder of Sandra Court, both of which took place in 1986.
Bennett Clark Hyde	United States	1909	1 (Note: Hyde was convicted of one murder, but irregularities in the trial procedure led to the verdict being overturned and two further trials both ended in a mistrial.)	3	Hyde was accused of murdering Thomas H. Swope and two members of his family under the guise of treating them for a typhoid epidemic in order that his wife would inherit a sizable amount of money. He was convicted of the murder of Thomas Swope, but his conviction was overturned on a technicality, two further trials ended in a mistrial and a fourth trial was not proceeded with.
David Moor	United Kingdom	1970s–1999	0	300 (Note: Number of victims Moor himself said he had claimed)	British doctor who was prosecuted for the "euthanasia" of a patient. He was found not guilty, but then admitted in a press interview to having "helped" 300 people to die. Some press reports referred to him as "Britain's greatest serial killer" and "Doctor Death". If the 300 victims are accepted as murder victims, he would have killed more than the most prolific serial killer known to the world, fellow British doctor Harold Shipman.
Edgar Matobato	Philippines	1988–2013	0	Hundreds	Self-confessed hitman and serial killer claiming to have killed people as part of the Davao Death Squad; his claims' authenticity has been challenged.
John Bodkin Adams	United Kingdom	1946–1956	0	163	Acquitted in a highly unusual trial in 1957 of murder but later found guilty of fraud. Archive evidence shows that he was almost certainly a killer but that his prosecution was sabotaged for political reasons.
The Man from the Train	United States	1898–1912	0	40–100+	Murdered entire families in their sleep, arriving and departing by train. Existence (and probable but not proven identity) discovered more than 100 years after the murders, by analysis of contemporary records, showing a markedly common modus operandi for many previously unconnected murders.
Bruno Lüdke	Weimar Republic; Nazi Germany	1928–1943	0	86	Mentally disabled, Lüdke was arrested after being discovered with a corpse. Police declared him insane and imprisoned him in a psychiatric hospital, where he died when he was experimented on. The only evidence tying him to the crimes was a confession that may have been physically coerced. He was never given a trial and he is generally considered innocent.
Manchester Pusher	United Kingdom	Since 2007	0	61+	Alleged serial killer supposedly responsible for the deaths of dozens of people drowned in canals in Manchester. Proponents of the theory point to the "alarming" number of deaths occurring in the Rochdale, Ashton and Bridgewater Canals since the early 2000s, with many of the victims being young gay men (as Manchester's canals have historically been used as gay cruising areas), but police have dismissed the serial killer theory and maintain that the deaths are unrelated.
David Parker Ray	United States	1950–1999	0	60	Torture-murderer possibly aided by numerous accomplices, including his girlfriend. Targeted victims around Truth or Consequences, New Mexico. Convicted of attempted killing of three victims and is suspected of 60 murders, even though no bodies were ever found. Known as the "Toybox Killer" for the self-built mobile home he used in the rape, torture, and killing of women.
Smiley Face Killer	United States	1990s–2000s	0	40+	Theoretical serial killer(s) thought by some sources to have drowned college-aged young men across the northern part of the country since 1997; most experts suggest that the deaths were accidental.
Howard Martin	United Kingdom	1977–2010	0	18+ (Note: Martin was acquitted in court for three murders, but was then struck off by the General Medical Council for "hastening" the deaths of 18 people. He later confessed to "bringing forward" the deaths of two of these people.)	British doctor who was prosecuted in 2005 for the deaths of three patients but was acquitted. However, the General Medical Council then struck him off as a doctor in 2010 for "hastening" the death of 18 people. He admitted to a newspaper to have killed two of these individuals.
Marie Besnard	France	1927–1949	0	13	Charged with the murders of 13 relatives with arsenic, all of whom had Besnard as their sole designated heir, but acquitted of all charges after three high-profile trials that lasted a decade.
Dr. X killings	United States	1966	0	9+	Suspicious deaths of nine people at Riverdell Hospital in Oradell, New Jersey. Mario Enrique Jascalevich was acquitted in 1978.
Alfred Leonard Cline	United States	1930–1945	0	9	Suspected of poisoning his eight wives and one man with sedative-laced buttermilk. Not enough evidence could be found to prosecute him for murder, but he was convicted of forging his victims' wills and died in prison in 1948.
Nathaniel Bar-Jonah	United States	1973–1999	0	5	Child molester sentenced to hundreds of years in prison for sexual offences. He was tried for abducting and murdering Zach Ramsey in 1999; though not convicted, he is widely considered responsible for the crime, and is suspected to have also cannibalized Ramsey. Police have additionally linked Bar-Jonah to the abduction and possible murder of four other children and teenagers.

== See also ==
- List of serial killers by country
- List of serial rapists by number of victims
