= Cornelius Burger =

South African serial killer (1900s–1930s)

- Born: c. 1900–1903
- Died: Late 1930s Psychiatric hospital in South Africa
- Cause of death: Sexually transmitted infection; possibly syphilis
- Motive: Revenge for contracting an STI from a prostitute
- Penalty: Involuntary commitment

Details
- Victims: 5 killed; 1 survived
- Span of crimes: 1936–1937
- Country: South Africa
- State: Gauteng
- Target: Prostitutes
- Date apprehended: 1937

Cornelius Burger (c. 1900–1903 – late 1930s) was a South African serial killer who, between 1936 and 1937, murdered five prostitutes in Johannesburg and took their handbags as souvenirs.

He committed the murders because he had contracted a venereal disease, which later proved fatal, from a prostitute. After one of his victims survived, Burger was arrested, but he did not stand trial due to the disease having spread to his brain, causing mental deterioration. Not long after, he died in a psychiatric hospital.

== Biography ==
Burger was born in the 1900s. Although married, he and his wife slept in separate bedrooms and rarely spoke to each other. He was in his mid-thirties by the time he started committing crimes.

=== Murders ===
At some point, Burger contracted a venereal disease, suspected to be syphilis, from a prostitute. By the time he learned of this, it was too late for treatment. He subsequently developed a hatred of prostitutes and vowed to murder them for revenge. Between 1936 and 1937, he strangled five streetwalkers to death and dumped their bodies along Potchefstroom Road, which runs through present-day Soweto. He also took the women's handbags as souvenirs, keeping them in a cupboard at his house.

The case was referred to the head CID Lieutenant, who, after getting permission from higher authorities, assembled a team of detectives to watch over streetwalkers as they worked. One to two detectives were assigned to each prostitute. Every night, they observed the women and wrote down the registration numbers of every vehicle that picked them up. The prostitutes would make their clients agree to drop them off at the same place they picked them up. This continued for months until prostitute Mavis Davids went missing. Police rushed to Potchefstroom Road, where they found her bleeding but alive. Davids informed detectives that a man in a large black car had picked her up. However, she had become nervous when he drove to Potchefstroom Road. Once he stopped his vehicle, she tried to escape, but he grabbed her by the neck and strangled her to unconsciousness.

=== Arrest and death ===
Investigators tracked down Burger's address from the vehicle registration number they had written down. Police waited outside of the house for hours until Burger returned in the morning. As soon as he returned in his car, armed detectives arrested him without any resistance. He then led them to his room where he kept the victims' handbags, three of which were definitely linked to the victims. Davids's purse was still in his car.

A medical examination found Burger unfit to stand trial on the grounds that his illness had already affected his brain. He was instead sent to a psychiatric hospital, where his illness rapidly progressed, causing him to die a short time later.

== Aftermath ==
The investigative work on the case was also compared to that on the Cape Town Prostitute Killer, where police used similar methods to try to protect prostitutes.

Ulf Boberg, the lead detective on the case, wrote a book about his experience titled, "Boberg Vertel."

== See also ==
- Violence against prostitutes
- List of serial killers in South Africa
- List of syphilis cases
