= John Phuko Kgabi =

Executed South African serial killer

- Born: 1944; Union of South Africa
- Died: February 6, 1980 (aged 35); Pretoria Central Prison, Pretoria, South Africa
- Cause of death: Execution by hanging
- Other name: "The Ritual Killer"
- Convictions: Murder x6 Attempted murder
- Penalty: Death x6 (murder); 5 years (attempted murder)

Details
- Victims: 6 (convicted); 11 (accused); 14 (possible)
- Span of crimes: 1974–1978
- Country: South Africa
- States: Gauteng, Limpopo
- Date apprehended: 26 November 1978

John Phuko Kgabi (1944 – 6 February 1980), known as The Ritual Killer, was a South African serial killer and a former police officer who murdered between six and at least eleven young girls in Atteridgeville and Limpopo. A sexually motivated killer, he would cut his victims' throats and then masturbate on their corpses. Convicted and sentenced to death, he was hanged in 1980.

== Life prior to murders ==
Little is known about Kgabi's early life, aside from the fact that he was born circa 1944. As a young man, he was married and had a young daughter, but suffered from issues with impotency. By the early 1970s, he was an officer in the South African Police and was tasked with dissecting corpses at a mortuary and providing help to the pathologist there. At one such shift, Kgabi had to cut up the body of a young teenage girl - when he made an incision on her throat, he suddenly got an erection. Surprised by this, Kgabi completed the work shift as usual but then proceeded to masturbate to the idea of cutting the girl's throat.

Kgabi kept doing this repeatedly until 1972 when he was dishonourably discharged from the Police Force for unknown reasons. His activities from 1972 to October 1974, the murder of his first known victim, have not been documented and some authors suspect he has killed others during this period.

== Killing spree ==
=== Initial murders ===
Kgabi's first known murder took place on 16 October 1974, when he lured 5-year-old Helen Tiny Ramskin away from a street in Atteridgeville, where she was waiting for her older sister. Her body was discovered later that same day on Church Street West with her throat cut.

On 9 March 1975, Kgabi stalked a young girl named Mavis Masekwaneng while she was walking down a street in Bandelierkop. He was seen by some children playing in a nearby playground, but they brushed it off and resumed their activities. A few minutes later, Masekwaneng was seen running down the road clutching her throat and crying, whereupon several bystanders wrapped her in a blanket and took her to the police station. She later succumbed to her injuries while at the station, determined to be the result of a large gash on her throat.

On 20 April, Kgabi approached two young girls playing at a local sports ground in Atteridgeville, ostensibly to request them to go buy him some cigarettes. One of the girls, 8-year-old Ouma Magdaline Seopela, agreed to accompany him, and a couple of days later, her body was found floating in a dam near Church Street West.

On 4 April 1976, Kgabi lured 8-year-old Josephine Mabena to an isolated corner in Atteridgeville, then proceeded to slash her throat twice, exposing her vocal cords. Mabena somehow managed to survive the initial attack, but was unable to give any clues to the authorities and would succumb to her injuries at a local hospital the following June.

=== Increase in frequency ===
Perhaps alarmed that his previous victim had survived, Kgabi returned to Bandelierkop on 11 April 1977 in search of a new victim. He noticed a young girl, Rosina Manetja, walking down the street and approached her to ask for directions. He then grabbed the girl and dragged her to the nearby veld, where he sat on top of her while he was cutting her throat with corrugated iron. Kgabi left her for dead, but Manetja survived after being hospitalised for a month. She later attended an identity parade to identify her assailant but was unable to conclusively point out the suspect to police.

On 18 May, 7-year-old Gemma Shabangu was reported missing from Atteridgeville. Ten days later, a man walking his dog near the Kalafong Hospital found the girl's body - like the previous victims, her throat had been cut, but this time, the killer had also cut off some flesh from one of her legs. Local residents, believing the killings to be the work of a witch doctor using the body parts for muti rituals or a sangoma, began to raid the homes of suspected practitioners.

In July, 9-year-old Lekgowa Magdaline Zondi left her aunt's house in Atteridgeville to go see her mother, but failed to arrive and was eventually reported missing on 31 July. A week later, on 6 August, several sheep herders were herding their sheep near Kalafong Hospital when they found the mutilated remains of Zondi. Like Shabangu, her throat had been cut and a piece of flesh had been removed from her leg.

On the following day, Kgabi accosted 7-year-old Eva Mavis Phalamohlaka in Atteridgeville by stealing her jacket. When the girl demanded that he return it to her, he instead dragged her to the veld, sat on her, and cut her throat with a piece of corrugated iron. Miraculously, Phalamohlaka survived, and upon regaining consciousness, she stumbled to the nearest house, which turned out to be that of a teacher. She was taken to a nearby hospital, where she remained for three months. Scared off by yet another victim surviving, Kgabi moved to Mamelodi.

Less than a month later on 2 October, Kgabi abducted 7-year-old Gloria Kathazile Khoza from Mamelodi. Her body was discovered on the following day near Bantule Station in Pretoria West, with her throat cut, her tongue cut out and her larynx and oesophagus removed. Out of desperation, the local police employed a powerful sangoma named Mpapane to help locate the killer - as his mother was also a sangoma, it was suggested that Kgabi learned of this and decided to cease killing for some time.

=== Third murder spree ===
On 14 May 1978, Kgabi was driving near Voortrekker Heights when he spotted 10-year-old Evelyn Mothoa, who was going to the bus station to buy a ticket so she could visit relatives in Atteridgeville. Presenting himself as the older brother of a friend, he lured her into his car and drove to Erasmia Street, where he dragged her off to the veld and attacked her. Mothoa was later found covered in blood by a cyclist, was taken to the hospital and survived. She later provided a description of her assailant's vehicle to the police.

By mid-June, Kgabi moved to live on Khudu Street in Atteridgeville. On 25 June, 8-year-old Jennifer Ramalekane went missing from the area, and her mutilated body was later found on 2 July. The mutilations were extensive, as not only flesh from her thigh had been removed, but her nose, toes, forehead, and tongue had been cut off.

On 27 August, the body of 9-year-old Elaine Tsitsana Mokwena was found abandoned near the Mangwena Mokone Higher Primary School, only 200 meters away from a police station. Fingerprints were lifted from this crime scene, but the offender went uncaught.

On 10 September, the body of 9-year-old Loretta Edwards was found in the veld between the suburbs of Hercules and Ga-Rankuwa in Pretoria. Edwards, who had been reported missing on 15 August, was found with her tongue removed. By then, a prominent sangoma named Sarah Mashele called a meeting to clear the name of fellow practitioners, as the crimes continued to be blamed on them without any conclusive evidence.

The killings and disappearances continued to escalate, despite the community's best efforts. On 11 October, 10-year-old Cynthia Mathabe vanished from her suburb in Ga-Rankuwa after going to take out the trash and remains missing to this day. On 20 November, a young girl from Alexandra named Nomonde Florence Sebolai was going to visit a church with a female friend when they were approached by Kgabi, who offered to pay them fifty cents if they could buy him a beer. Sebolai agreed to accompany him, and her mutilated body was found in Saulsville that same day.

== Final murder and capture ==
Shortly after Sebolai's murder, Kgabi changed locations yet again, this time settling in Seshego in northern Limpopo. On November 26, he was driving around the township when he spotted a young girl named Martha Hluni Mothiba at a shop and offered to give her a ride. When the little girl failed to arrive home, her father Simon Mothiba organised a search party to help find her.

Unbeknownst to Kgabi, a 12-year-old boy named Simon Molesa had seen him pick up Martha in his silver-grey car, and as he accompanied the adult men in the search party, he was able to recognise the car. When they opened it, they found Kgabi sitting inside. Although he denied any connection to his daughter's disappearance, Mothiba realised that she was dead and egged the other men to join him in beating Kgabi up. They then proceeded to beat him severely before opting to transport him to the police station. Kgabi still refused to confess to the murder but claimed that he could take the officers and Mothiba to the place where he had "found" her body.

On their way through the veld, Kgabi said that he needed to urinate, but one policeman noticed that he dropped something and was desperately trying to bury it. Upon closer inspection, it was revealed to be a piece of a human windpipe. Unable to hide his guilt any longer, Kgabi led them to Mothiba's mutilated body, which her father covered with a shirt and prayed.

== Trial and sentence ==
Kgabi was soon charged with Mothiba's murder and transferred to the Weskoppies Psychiatric Hospital in Pretoria for a psychiatric examination. Fearing he would be killed by fellow inmates, he was kept there only for a week and transferred elsewhere. Kgabi was eventually found to be sane, and was allowed to stand trial.

Due to the similarities with the previous murders, Kgabi was charged with five additional murders, as prosecutors lacked enough evidence to charge him with all the crimes. Initially, he denied all responsibility and claimed that the interrogators had beaten him with a hose and given him electroshocks. Notably, he pointed out that some of participating officers were black like him, as police brutality was believed to be primarily committed by white officers on black citizens during the Apartheid era.

In spite of his claims of innocence, Kgabi was convicted of all six murders he was charged with: those of Shabangu, Khoza, Ramalekane, Edwards, Mokwena, and Mothiba. He was given six death sentences for each count, as well as a 5-year prison term for the attempted murder of Mothoa. When he took the stand, Kgabi finally admitted his guilt in these cases and to meticulously planning every murder. He also said that he had kept the severed body parts to himself so he could masturbate to them, refuting the theory that he was selling them for money.

=== Suspected murders ===
Aside from his confirmed murders and those he was not charged with due to a lack of evidence, Atteridgeville police considered Kgabi a possible suspect in three further murders. These included the double murder of sisters Magrietha and Patricia Goliat (8 and 10, respectively) in 1973 and a young woman named Olga Mokwane in November 1976, all of whom were killed in similar circumstances to his known victims. Kgabi denied involvement in these murders, and no solid evidence has surfaced to indicate that he killed them.

== Execution ==
Kgabi's subsequent appeals were rejected, and he was hanged at the Pretoria Central Prison on 6 February 1980.

== See also ==
- List of serial killers in South Africa

== Bibliography ==
- Micki Pistorius (3 October 2012). Strangers On The Street - Serial homicide in South Africa. Penguin Random House South Africa. ISBN 978-0143527176.
