= Andries Makgae =

Convicted South African serial killer

- Born: 1962 (age 63–64); Onderstepoort, South Africa
- Convictions: Murder x3 Attempted murder Robbery
- Penalty: Life imprisonment x3 (Murders); 10 years imprisonment (other charges)

Details
- Victims: 3–4+
- Span of crimes: 2012–2013
- Country: South Africa
- State: Gauteng
- Date apprehended: October 2013

Andries Makgae (born 1962) is a South African serial killer and rapist who raped and murdered at least three women in Onderstepoort between 2012 and 2013. Suspected of other similar murders and the supposed killing of his best friend. He was convicted and sentenced to three life imprisonment terms for his crimes.

== Early life ==
Little is known about Makgae's early life. Born in 1962 in Onderstepoort, he was given a 10-year sentence for robbery and attempted murder in the early 2000s, but was released on parole in 2011. Despite being married to a Zimbabwean woman, he had a fixation on older women, even claiming to have been in a sexual relationship with his first victim.

== Murders ==
Makgae's modus operandi consisted of luring his victims, most of whom were older women, to a local shebeen, where he would pin, rape and strangle them with their underwear. After killing them, Makgae would then discard the corpses in bushes or a smallholding housing illegal immigrants, where he let the bodies decompose or get eaten by wild animals.

His first known kill was 60-year-old Maria Pilore, a woman last seen visiting a tavern in Onderstepoort on January 1, 2012. Pilore had been on her way to get some water from the nearby Bon Accord Dam, when Makgae waylaid, assaulted and killed her. By the time the body was found, it was in a state of severe decomposition, and Pilore was only identified by family members thanks to the shoes she wore and the bucket found next to her body. Because of the decomposition, cause of death couldn't be established.

A few weeks after, on February 4, Makgae ambushed 69-year-old Juliet Mokgatla, who was going to a nearby shop. After raping the elderly woman, he used her own underwear to strangle her to death, leaving her body in the dense bushes, where it was discovered only days later. Almost ten months later, on January 3, 2013, Makgae broke into the home of 29-year-old Praise Mpatsi, who had been left home alone by her husband, who had gone to work. After strangling her with her underwear, Makgae dragged her corpse to the smallholding, where he left in the dense bushes. After Mpatsi's husband returned home, he found that his wife was missing and reported her disappearance to the police. Three weeks later, her decomposing body was located.

While the police were busy searching for the missing women, the elusive killer struck for the final time on January 10, a week after he had killed Mpatsi. He broke into the home of 44-year-old Selina Eva Matjela, raping her twice during the night in a brutal manner. On the following morning, he demanded cash from the injured woman, then fled. After finding their relative, Matjela's brothers called the police, who managed to track down and arrest Andries Makgae.

== Trial and imprisonment ==
When he was interrogated and conducted investigative experiments with the authorities, Makgae claimed to one of the officers, Werner van den Berg, that he had developed a hatred towards women because one had allegedly infected him with HIV, which he accidentally had passed down to his wife, whom later died after his arrest. In addition, he pointed the officers to other supposed crime scenes in Kameeldrift and Villieria, where Makgae claimed to have buried the bodies of other undisclosed victims, but after a thorough search with police dog units, no remains or bones were located. Despite this, Van den Berg expressed his belief that Makgae was likely responsible for more crimes that he was eventually charged with, possibly upwards of ten murders and numerous rapes.

In a pre-trial motion, Justice Mmonoa Teffo ordered that Makgae be interned at the Weskoppies Psychiatric Hospital, where he was to undergo a psychiatric exam to determine whether he was sane enough to stand trial for the killings. After he was deemed sane, Makgae was returned to stand trial on charges of killing Pilore, Mokgatla, Mpatsi and his best friend, who was killed and his house burned, allegedly after finding out that Makgae was a murderer. He was also charged with the rape of Matjela, whom, at the time, was still alive but heavily injured. Makgae pleaded guilty to the murder charges, but not the rape charges, denied that he had ever done such a thing to his victims, but nonetheless, he was found guilty and sentenced to three consecutive life imprisonment terms. After reading out his verdict, Justice Vivian Tlhapi said that the defendant was a danger to society and unable to be rehabilitated. Not long after the verdict was announced, Selina Matjela died from natural causes, but her examining doctor determined that the attempted murder had likely sped up the process of her early demise.

== See also ==
- List of serial killers in South Africa
