= Fanuel =

Fanuel is a given name. Notable people with the given name include:

- Fanuel Kenosi (born 1988), Botswana sprinter
- Fanuel Kozonguizi (1932-1995), Namibian lawyer and politician
- Fanuel Magangani, Malawaian Anglican bishop
- Fanuel Makamu (born 1977), South African robber, rapist and serial killer
- Fanuel Massingue (born 1982), Mozambican footballer
