= List of serial killers in South Africa =

A serial killer is typically a person who murders three or more people, with the murders taking place over more than a month and including a significant period of time between them. However, South Africa uses a more lenient definition of serial murder, defining it as, "The unlawful killing of two or more victims by the same offender(s), in separate events."

== Identified serial killers ==
Name	Nickname / AKA	Years active	Proven victims	Possible victims	Status	Notes	Ref
Baninzi, Asande		2001	14	18	Sentenced to life imprisonment	Together with accomplice Mthutuzeli Nombewu, robbed and murdered people in the Cape Flats area	
Barber, Peter Roy	The Laughing Killer	1973–1979	3	4	Executed in 1980	English immigrant who murdered his mistresses and a 12-year-old girl in Pinetown after arguments	
Basson, Pierre	The Insurance Killer	1903–1906	9	9+	Committed suicide to avoid apprehension	Murdered people in Claremont, Cape Town so he could get their life insurance; South Africa's first recorded serial killer	
Brown, John Frank	The Cross Dressing Killer(s)	1993–1995	5	5	Sentenced to life imprisonment	Together with accomplice and lover Jacques Coetzee murdered other gay men around Johannesburg	
Brandt, Brydon		1989–1997	4	5	Sentenced to life imprisonment	Murdered prostitutes and his roommates in the Eastern Cape	
Burger, Cornelius		1936–1937	5	5	Died in a psychiatric facility	Murdered prostitutes as revenge for contracting a venereal disease	
Coetzee, Jacques	The Cross Dressing Killer(s)	1993–1995	5	5	Committed suicide in custody	Together with accomplice and lover John Frank Brown murdered other gay men around Johannesburg	
Duma, Sibusiso		2007	7	7	Sentenced to life imprisonment	Killed various people around Pietermaritzburg during robberies	
Kgabi, John Phuko	The Ritual Killer	1974–1978	6	14	Executed in 1980	Former police officer who garroted and mutilated young girls in Atteridgeville and Limpopo	
Lineveldt, Gamal Salie		1940	4	4	Executed in 1942	Bludgeoned four women to death in Cape Town	
Maake, Cedric	The Wemmer Pan Killer	1996–1997	27	27+	Sentenced to life imprisonment	Serial rapist who murdered victims in the Wemmer Pan area	
Mabhayi, Bulelani	The Monster of Tholeni	2007–2012	20	20	Sentenced to life imprisonment	House intruder who murdered women and children in the village of Tholeni	
Majola, Simon	The Bruma Lake Killer(s)	2000–2001	8	8+	Sentenced to life imprisonment	Together with accomplice Themba Nkosi, known as "The Bruma Lake Killers"; robbed and drowned men in Bruma Lake	
Makamu, Fanuel	The Mpumalanga Serial Rapist	2000	6	6	Sentenced to life imprisonment	Together with accomplice Henry Maile, robbed, raped and murdered women around Mpumalanga	
Maketta, Jimmy	The Jesus Killer	2005	16	16	Sentenced to life imprisonment	Murdered farm labourers in Philippi	
Makgae, Andries		2012–2013	3	4+	Sentenced to life imprisonment	Raped and murdered women around Onderstepoort; suspected in best friend's murder	
Makhubela, Dumisani	Lotto Gangster(s)	2005	7	7	Sentenced to life imprisonment	Together with accomplice Johannes van Rooyen, robbed, raped and murdered people around Mpumalanga, including a family of four	
Mashiane, Johannes	The Beast of Atteridgeville	1977–1989	13	13	Committed suicide to avoid apprehension	Murdered his girlfriend; after release, raped and strangled 12 young boys around Atteridgeville	
Mfeka, Samuel Bongani		1993–1996	6	6+	Sentenced to life imprisonment	Raped and strangled women around KwaZulu-Natal	
Mogale, Jack	The West-End Killer	2008–2009	16	16	Sentenced to life imprisonment	Kidnapped, raped and murdered women in southern Johannesburg	
Msomi, Elifasi	The Axe Killer	1953–1955	15	15	Executed in 1956	Murdered people while he was supposedly under the influence of a Tokoloshe	
Mulaudzi, Mukosi Freddy	The Limpopo Serial Killer	1990–2006	13	13	Sentenced to life imprisonment	Murdered two people in 1990, then escaped from prison and resumed killing	
Ncama, Nicholas Lungisa	The East Cape Killer	1997	6	6	Sentenced to life imprisonment	Raped and strangled women around Port Elizabeth	
Ndlangamandla, Velaphi	The Saloon Killer	1998	19	19	Sentenced to life imprisonment	Robbed and murdered people during home invasions in Mpumalanga	
Ndlovu, Rosemary		2012–2018	6	6	Sentenced to life imprisonment	Former policewoman who murdered her ex-partner and relatives for life and funeral insurance policies	
Ntsieni, Ndivhuwo	The Univen serial killer	2014	5	5	Sentenced to life imprisonment	Raped and murdered women and young girls in and around the University of Venda	
Nyauza, Richard	The Quarry Killer	2002–2006	18	19	Sentenced to life imprisonment	Raped and murdered women after being infected with HIV, dumping their bodies in a quarry	
Randitsheni, David	The Modimolle Serial Killer	2004–2008	10	10	Committed suicide in prison	Abducted, raped and murdered children in Modimolle	
van Rooyen, Gert		1988–1989	6	6+	Committed suicide to avoid apprehension	Pedophile who, together with accomplice and wife Joey Haarhoff, abducted, raped and murdered six teenage girls whose bodies have never been found	
van Rooyen, Johannes	Lotto Gangster(s)	2005	7	7	Sentenced to life imprisonment	Together with accomplice Dumisani Makhubela, robbed, raped and murdered people around Mpumalanga, including a family of four	
van Schoor, Louis	The Apartheid Killer	1986–1989	9	39+	20 years; released in the 2003 and died a free man in 2024	Former policeman and security guard who killed black South Africans during alleged crimes	
Sedumedi, Khangayi	The Century City Killer	2011–2015	4	6	Sentenced to life imprisonment	Raped and murdered women around Century City and Kensington	
Sidyno, Samuel	The Capital Park Serial Killer	1998–1999	7	7	Sentenced to life imprisonment	Strangled teenagers and women, then disposed of their bodies near the Pretoria Zoo	
Sithole, Moses	The ABC Killer	1994–1995	38	76	Sentenced to life imprisonment	Raped and murdered women around Atteridgeville, Boksburg and Cleveland	
Stander, Riaan		2001–2007	3	3	Sentenced to life imprisonment	Murdered two prostitutes in Port Elizabeth after being released from prison for running over a woman with his car	
Sukude, Themba	The Newcastle Serial Killer	2004–2005	4	4	Sentenced to life imprisonment	Attacked couples around parks, raping the female and bludgeoning the male to death with rocks. He later switched to solely targeting men	
Taki, Thozamile	The Sugarcane Killer	2007	13	13	Sentenced to life imprisonment	Robbed and murdered women around KwaZulu-Natal and Eastern Cape, dumping their bodies in sugarcane and tea plantations	
Thwala, Sipho	The Phoenix Strangler	1996–1997	16	16+	Sentenced to life imprisonment	Raped and murdered women in sugarcane fields near Phoenix	
Vilakazi, Themba	The Railway Killer	2005	3	5	Sentenced to life imprisonment	Murdered black males around Pretoria	
Wilken, Stewart	The Boetie Boer	1990–1997	10	10+	Sentenced to life imprisonment	Raped and murdered prostitutes, young boys and his own daughter around Port Elizabeth	
Williams, Tommy	The City Serial Killer	1987–2008	3	3	Sentenced to life imprisonment	Strangled three acquaintances in varying circumstances; South Africa's longest active serial offender	
Xitavhudzi, Elias	The Pangaman	1960s	16	16	Executed	Used a panga (machete) to murder and mutilate women around Atteridgeville	
Zikode, Christopher Mhlengwa	The Donnybrook Serial Killer	1994–1995	18	18	Sentenced to life imprisonment	Necrophiliac house intruder who murdered people around Donnybrook, then had sex with the female victims' corpses	

== Unidentified serial killers ==
Nickname	Years active	Proven victims	Possible victims	Region(s) where active	Notes	Ref
Cape Town Prostitute Killer	1992–1996	19	19	Western Cape	Strangled prostitutes and domestic workers around Cape Town	
Fosaville serial killer	1999–2003	13	13	KwaZulu-Natal	Abducted, bound and strangled women around Newlands East	
Sleepy Hollow Killer	1990s–2007	13	16+	Kwa-Zulu Natal (confirmed); Free State, Eastern Cape (suspected)	Raped and strangled women, mostly sex workers and prostitutes, using their own panties	

== Suspected serial killers ==
Name	Years active	Proven Victims	Possible Victims	Status	Notes
Daisy de Melker	1923–1932	1	3	Executed 1932	Accused of murdering two husbands and her son, but only convicted for her son's death.
Norman Afzal Simons	1986–1994	1	22	Released on parole in 2023	Raped and strangled young boys with pieces of their clothing, their hands bound behind their backs, their shoes removed and their faces pushed into the sand.

== See also ==
- Lists of serial killers

== Bibliography ==
- Burkhalter Chmelir, Sandra (2003). "Serial Killers". In Robert Kastenbaum (ed.). Macmillan Encyclopedia of Death and Dying. Vol. 2. New York: Macmillan Reference USA/Thomson/Gale. p. 1. Archived from the original on 3 May 2009.
- Morton, RJ (2005). "Serial murder multi-disciplinary perspectives for investigators" (PDF). Federal Bureau of Investigation.
- Hollandsworth, Skip (2015). The Midnight Assassin (1st ed.). New York: Henry Holt. p. 81. ISBN 978-0-8050-9767-2.
- Lane, Brian; Gregg, Wilfred (1995) [1992]. The Encyclopedia Of Serial Killers. New York City: Berkley Book. ISBN 0-425-15213-8.
