= Stander =

Stander may refer to:

- Standing frame for assisting the physically challenged
- Stander (surname)
- Stander (film) 2003 film about bank robber Andre Stander
- Line stander job position
