= Khangayi Sedumedi =

South African serial killer

- Born: Kangai Sedumedi; 1977 (age 48–49); Gugulethu, Western Cape, South Africa
- Other names: "The Century City Killer" "The Century City Serial Killer" "Jesus"
- Conviction: Murder
- Penalty: Life imprisonment

Details
- Victims: 4–6
- Span of crimes: 2011–2015
- Country: South Africa
- State: Western Cape
- Date apprehended: January 5, 2015
- Imprisoned at: Unnamed prison in Cape Town

Khangayi Sedumedi (born Kangai Sedumedi; 1977), known as The Century City Killer, is a South African serial killer and rapist, responsible for the murders of between four and six women in the aforementioned Cape Town neighbourhood between 2011 and 2015. He was convicted on four counts and given seven life sentences in 2016, and is currently incarcerated at an unnamed prison in Cape Town.

== Biography ==
Born as the only child of a Shona man Adam Wapaka and Xhosa Jacqueline Sedumedi, he was named Kangai at birth, but Xhosa's relatives from the family pronounced it as Khangayi. He was raised by his grandmother, who had him regularly attend services at the local church, along with his aunt and cousins. Khangayi was given the nickname "Jesus" by childhood friends, as he never got angry at anybody no matter the circumstances, and always avoided fighting with other youths.

In 1990, Sedumedi's mother Jacqueline disappeared suddenly, with her whereabouts still unknown. This took a great toll on the young Khangayi, who became a shy loner who avoided having his picture taken, to the point where even his own family didn't have any photographs of him. Even stranger, in the years before his arrest, he would disappear mysteriously for weeks on end, only to later return saying that he was "just around". In 2012, he vanished for almost a year before suddenly resurfacing in 2013, claiming he had been in France.

Despite his odd behaviour and frequent vanishings, Sedumedi was regarded as a hard worker and an ambitious person, with a passion for the Orlando Pirates. In 2003, he quickly befriended Roland Thabo Mpofu, whom Khangayi treated as a brother and referred to by the nickname "TaTibo". Mpofu, who later married one of Sedumedi's cousins, noted in a later interview that Khangayi always spoke highly of his all-female cousins and was never visibly violent to women. However, he and the family alike were puzzled by the fact that he had never spoken of a girlfriend or even a female friend. Before his arrest, he was working as a security guard.

== Murders, trial and imprisonment ==
In the period between November 2011 and January 2015, a series of violent crimes against women occurred in the Cape Town suburbs of Century City and Kensington, mostly centred around the train station in Century City. A total of eight victims were raped, with six of them being murdered by their attacker: the youngest being a 15-year-old, who was raped both vaginally and anally and sustained multiple injuries during her assault. The bodies of the deceased were discovered in a field near Acre Road between February and December 2014, all of them naked and with their hands tied behind their backs. In an effort to catch the perpetrator and calm down the frightened community, Cape Town Mayor Patricia de Lille offered a reward of 50,000 rands to anybody who could help capture the killer.

On 5 January 2015, Sedumedi was taken in for questioning regarding the crimes. Before long, he was charged with 23 counts, including eight rapes, four murders, two kidnappings, five robberies with aggravating circumstances, attempted robbery with aggravating circumstances, and attempted rape and assault, all before the Goodwood Magistrates Court. He entered into a plea deal and confessed his guilt to all but two of the charges. While in court, he explained his modus operandi: selecting his victims, mostly young jobseekers, at random, he approached the women under the pretext of possible job opportunities. He obtained their contact details, and would later phone the victim, claiming to have secured them a job interview. Agreeing to meet on a specific date, he would ambush the victim in an isolated place, where he would rape, rob and kill them. In some instances, he used a plastic toy gun to force them into submission. He also confessed to murdering the women so they could not identify him later on. Taking into account all the charges against him, Justice John Hlope gave him seven life sentences, as well as an additional 40 years of imprisonment.

== See also ==
- List of serial killers in South Africa
