= Louis van Schoor =

South African mass killer (1951–2024)

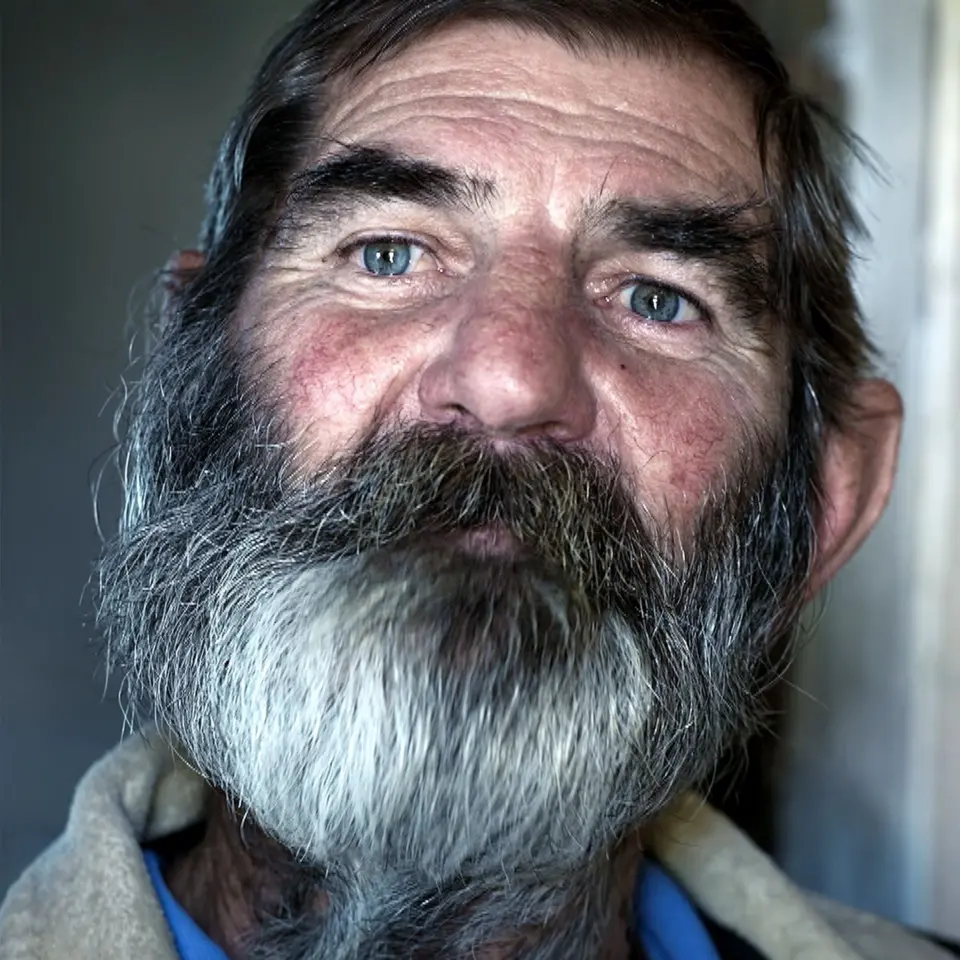
- Van Schoor photographed for an interview by the BBC in 2024
- Born: Sybrand Jacobus Lodewikus van Schoor; 1951; South Africa
- Died: 25 July 2024 (aged 72); East London, South Africa
- Other name: "The Apartheid Killer"
- Status: Deceased
- Motive: White supremacy
- Convictions: Murder (7 counts); Attempted murder (2 counts)
- Penalty: 20 years imprisonment

Details
- Victims: 9–39
- Span of crimes: 1986–1989
- Country: South Africa

Sybrand Jacobus Lodewikus "Louis" van Schoor (Afrikaans pronunciation: [ˈsibrant jaˈkuəbœs luədəˈvikœs fɑn ˈskuər], 1951 – 25 July 2024), known as the Apartheid Killer, was a South African mass killer, policeman, and security guard who committed murders between 1986 and 1989. He was arrested in 1991 and convicted of seven murders and two attempted murders but was released on parole in 2004. It is believed that the total number of his victims was 39, all of them in East London, South Africa. Thirty-two of the killings were described as "justifiable homicides" by police, while Schoor himself insisted that his victims were "criminals" whom he had caught in the act.

Schoor died from sepsis to his leg on 25 July 2024, at the age of 72.

Louis van Schoor was the father of Sabrina van Schoor, who was sentenced to twenty-five years in prison for hiring a hitman to murder her mother in 2002. Both were incarcerated in Fort Glamorgan prison before Louis van Schoor's release in 2004. Many black people celebrated Sabrina van Schoor for killing her mother, whom one of Sabrina's former boyfriends had described as "very arrogant and racist."

Before he died in 2024, the BBC broadcast a four-year investigation by Isa Jacobsen as part of "World of Secrets. "The Apartheid Killer" was presented by Ayanda Charlie and Charlie Northcott in August 2024. Van Schoor is quoted as saying "I’ve got no remorse inside because I don’t feel that I was wrong." The programme includes allegations that the police colluded in his crimes. He had reported each death to the police and some who survived testified that he had toyed with them while needlessly attacking them.

== See also ==
- List of serial killers in South Africa
- List of serial killers by number of victims
