= Pierre Basson =

South African serial killer (1880–1906)

- Sketch of Basson, first published in The World's News
- Born: Pierre Corneille Faculyn Basson; 3 January 1880; Paarl, Cape Colony (modern-day South Africa)
- Died: 10 February 1906 (aged 26); Claremont, Cape Town, Cape Colony
- Cause of death: Self-inflicted gunshot wound
- Conviction: N/A
- Penalty: N/A (died before trial)

Details
- Victims: 9+
- Span of crimes: 1903–1906
- Country: Cape Colony
- State: Western Cape
- Date apprehended: N/A

Pierre Corneille Faculyn Basson (3 January 1880 – 10 February 1906) was a serial killer in the Cape Colony, present-day South Africa. He murdered at least nine people, including one of his brothers, in and around Claremont, Cape Town, so he could later claim their life insurance payout.

Facing imminent arrest for the murder of a farmer, Basson shot himself.

== Early life ==
Pierre, the oldest of four siblings of farmers Johannes and Anna Basson, was born in Paarl on 3 January 1880. He came from a respected family of Huguenots who were early settlers of the Cape Colony, and was generally regarded well. However, unbeknownst to most, Basson started exhibiting violent tendencies from an early age in the form of cruelty to animals. Various sources give differing accounts about what exactly he did, but a notable incident was him roasting a cat alive over a slow fire.

Afterwards, he stopped committing violent offences for a number of years but gained a reputation as a petty thief—which caused issues at home. Despite his criminal tendencies, Basson exhibited above average intelligence at school and later graduated from one of the most prestigious colleges in the Cape Colony.

On 15 October 1900, when Pierre was around 20 years old, his father died after a short illness, leading to Pierre receiving a sum of about £2,500 in life insurance. Later on, rumors arose that the elder Basson might have been the victim of a homicide, but this has never been substantiated. A couple of years after his father's death, Basson won £5,000 from a lottery and used the money to buy a farmhouse in Claremont, nicknamed "The Arums", from where he managed the family business.

== Murders ==
As adult, Basson started working as an insurance agent and rent collector, and would frequently convince various acquaintances to insure themselves in his name. Between 1903 and 1906, many of these acquaintances either disappeared or died in suspicious circumstances. Basson would later be linked to most of these deaths, but a conclusive motive was never established. Some theories suggested that he spent the money to fund a supposed drug habit at a seedy establishment in Signal Hill, while others claimed that the young Pierre was simply a miser who hoarded it all.

The first notable death was Basson's younger brother, Jasper. Around 1903, the two brothers went fishing in Gordon's Bay – later that day, Pierre returned alone and claimed that his brother had fallen off a cliff and drowned. Due to the fact that he benefitted from the £3,5000 insurance policy, Pierre was immediately suspected and initially refused ownership of the money by the insurance companies. The matter was taken to court, with Pierre emerging victorious and received the money. Not long after his brother's death, Basson went traveling with a friend named Bosman, but again returned by himself, claiming that his friend had died in an "accident". A search party was organized and quickly found Bosman's body, which had gunshot wounds to the head. He was known to carry a large sum of money on him, leading to suspicions that he was also killed by his newfound companion.

Some time later, a similar death happened to a farmer named Adolf Beck. Beck was found drowned in a shallow pool at Paarden Eiland, and when his body was dragged out of the water, it showed signs of strangulation. Similarly to Jasper Basson, Beck had a life insurance policy issued in his name of which Pierre was the beneficiary.

Aside from these crimes, Basson was implicated in other similar crimes of which little information is available. Among them was the supposed non-fatal drugging of a business partner whom he forced to hand over money under duress, and the mysterious disappearance of another business partner named Mr. Haupt. Haupt vanished after collecting money from a third party and delivering it Basson, and has never been located since. Yet another victim, an unnamed English carpenter, was found dead on a beach near Woodstock in July 1905 and was immediately decried as a victim of Basson's, but he was never arrested for this crime due to a lack of conclusive evidence of his guilt.

One alleged survivor of Basson's crime spree was another traveling companion, a Mr. Retief. Basson invited him on a walk along the veld, supposedly intent on recruiting him for an upcoming murder, but instead attempted to sedate the man with a handkerchief coated in chloroform. Retief noticed this and quickly ran away, but seemingly did not report this incident to the police.

In total, it was alleged that the total profit of Basson's crimes amounted to £16,500. Most of these proceeds came from the life insurance policies he collected, as well as separate ventures of investment, fraud and various swindles.

== Final murder and suicide ==
On 22 January 1906, an elderly German farmer named Wilhelm Schaefer departed from his farm in the Cape Flats area to Basson's residence in Claremont. The purpose of the visit was to facilitate the sale of Schaefer's farm, which he had sold to Basson for £1,020. Schaefer left his cart and horses in the care of a blacksmith, saying that he was going to the Basson residence. That same night, Basson was observed lighting a fire near his residence using paraffin wax, supposedly to get rid of evidence. After failing to appear in the next couple of days, Basson was questioned about the man's whereabouts, whereupon he said that Schaefer had gone to Kimberley.

While investigating the mysterious disappearance, local police were inundated with numerous anonymous letters implicating Basson in Schaefer's supposed murder. The letters – thought to be written by a woman due to the handwriting – indicated that a body had been buried in Basson's fowl house. Despite this, Basson was still not charged due to a lack of evidence, but increasingly became the focus of public attention after Scottish detective Willie Walker allowed a newspaper publication to publish a written statement by Basson's mother in she died giving him any money. In anger, Basson at first threatened to shoot the newspaper editor, but after calming down, he forced his mother to issue a public statement in which she claimed to have indeed handed over the money to her son.

On 10 February, several officers went to the Basson residence to dig out the fowl house, as they had received a tip from a Khoekhoe woman named Caroline in which she claimed to have overheard Pierre ordering somebody to help him bury a body there. Unbeknownst to them, Basson was inside the house and watching them dig, and about half an hour after the dig began, he suddenly started apologizing to his mother and went to a nearby room. There, he retrieved his brother's Bergmann pistol and, after admitting that he was guilty and implicating his best friend as an accomplice, he shot himself in the mouth, dying instantly. Eventually, authorities found Schaefer's naked body covered in quicklime, which bore signs of being drugged and strangled. Family members would later claim that they had seen Pierre digging in the fowl house over the previous week, supposedly to install a new drain, but all claimed that they were unaware of what his actual motives were.

Following his suicide, Basson was implicated in at least nine murders over the course of three years. Three men alleged to be his accomplices in Schaefer's murder - Basson's best friend Tobias "Toby" Louw, Hendrik Christian van Holdt and a Malay servant named Abdulla - were later arrested for supposedly burying the man's body in the fowl house. In the end, charges against Van Holdt and Abdulla were dropped and only Louw was set to stand trial, but was acquitted of all charges and released.

== See also ==
- List of serial killers in South Africa
