= Thierry Paulin =

French serial killer

- Born: 28 November 1963; Fort-de-France, Martinique
- Died: 16 April 1989 (aged 25); Fresnes Prison, Fresnes, France
- Other names: "The Monster of Montmartre" "The Grim Reaper of Paris" "The Beast of Montmartre" "The Old Lady Killer"
- Conviction: Died before trial

Details
- Victims: 18–27
- Span of crimes: 1984–1987
- Country: France
- State: Île-de-France
- Date apprehended: 1 December 1987

Thierry Paulin (28 November 1963 – 16 April 1989), known as The Monster of Montmartre (French: Le monstre de Montmartre), was a French serial killer active in the 1980s who murdered 27 elderly women. He died from complications related to AIDS before his trial.

== Childhood and teenage years ==
Paulin was born in Fort-de-France, Martinique. His father flew to metropolitan France just after his birth, leaving his teenaged mother to fend for herself and the baby. Paulin was raised in Martinique by his paternal grandmother, who owned a restaurant and allegedly paid little attention to her grandson. When he was ten, Paulin started to live with his now-married mother, trying to blend in with his stepbrothers and sisters. His behaviour started to become erratic and violent towards the other children, and eventually, his mother asked his father to take their son to metropolitan France. His father accepted in order to avoid paying alimony.

As a mixed-race student among white peers, Paulin had few friends. He performed poorly at school, failing his exams. At the age of 17, he decided to enter military service early, joining a logistics branch of the airborne forces.

On 14 November 1982, he robbed an old woman in her grocery, menacing her with a knife; the grocer knew him as a customer, however, and he was soon arrested. In June 1983, he was sentenced to two years in prison, but the sentence was suspended.

== From Toulouse to Paris ==
In 1984, after leaving the army, Paulin learned that his mother and her family now lived in Nanterre, a western suburb of Paris. He went there to live with them, but his relationship was hostile.

Paulin became a waiter at the Paradis Latin, a nightclub renowned for its drag shows. There, he started a career as an artist, dressed in drag and singing tunes by his favourite singer, Eartha Kitt. His mother was once invited to watch her son's performance, but she left the club a few seconds after the beginning of the act.

The most important event that happened to Paulin at the Paradis Latin was meeting Jean-Thierry Mathurin. The 19-year-old Mathurin was born in French Guiana, and was a drug addict. Paulin fell in love with him and they soon became lovers. Paulin was also addicted, but less severely, and sold drugs as well.

On 5 October 1984, two elderly women were assaulted in Paris. Germaine Petitot, 91, survived but was too traumatized to give a detailed description of the criminals. Anna Barbier-Ponthus, 83, died after being beaten and asphyxiated beneath a pillow. Her murderer robbed her of 300 francs (about $50).

In October–November 1984, eight other old women were murdered, mainly in the 18th arrondissement of Paris, but in neighbouring areas too. The violence of the crimes was notable; some of the victims had their heads stuck into plastic bags, some were beaten to death, and one of them was forced to drink drain cleaner. In all cases, the motive appeared to be robbery. Some reports allege that Paulin singled out women who seemed unpleasant or unfriendly when he engaged them in conversation, while Paulin himself told police that "I only tackled the weakest of them."

At the same time, Paulin and Mathurin were leading an extravagant lifestyle, spending their nights dancing, drinking champagne, and snorting cocaine. In late November, they decided to go to Toulouse to stay for a few months at the home of Paulin's father. But the elder Paulin was unable to accept his son's lover, and violent fights ensued, ending when Paulin and Mathurin broke up. Mathurin returned to Paris, while Paulin tried to start his own firm of transvestite artists, a plan which failed in the autumn of 1985.

== The second wave of murders ==
From 20 December 1985 to 14 June 1986, eight more elderly women were murdered. The police were unable to identify the killer, though the investigators had a few clues. Police determined through fingerprint evidence that the perpetrator was the same individual who committed the 1984 murders. However, in the new murders, the killer appeared to favour quicker, less cruel methods.

In the autumn of 1986, Paulin attacked one of his cocaine dealers with a baseball bat. The dealer went to the police, and Paulin was arrested. Paulin was sentenced to 16 months imprisonment for the assault. However, after he was diagnosed as HIV positive, this increased the number of killings in what seemed like a race against time to kill as many as possible, as he knew he was in his last years.

== The final killings ==
Knowing that he was in effect under a death sentence from AIDS, Paulin organized lavish parties, spending a lot of money and sparing no expense. Paulin paid for these parties with stolen credit cards and cheques, and with the proceeds from his murders.

On 25 November 1987, Paulin murdered Rachel Cohen, age 79. On the same day, he attacked an 87-year-old woman, Berthe Finalteri, whom he suffocated and left for dead. Two days later, he strangled Geneviève Germont, who would be his last victim.

As Paulin celebrated his 24th birthday, Finalteri unexpectedly recovered, and was able to give an accurate description of her attacker, stating that he was "un métis d'une vingtaine d'années coiffé à la Carl Lewis, avec une boucle d'oreille à l'oreille gauche" (literally "a mix-race man in his twenties, with hair like Carl Lewis and an earring in his left ear"). On 1 December, Paulin was arrested while walking down the street when a local police inspector, Francis Jacob, recognized him from Finalteri's description. After two days in custody, Paulin admitted everything, including his involvement with Mathurin. Accused of committing 18 murders (though he claimed responsibility for 21), he was sent to jail awaiting trial.

In early 1988, Paulin fell ill, as his body began to succumb to the effects of AIDS. Within a year he was hospitalized in a state of near-paralysis, suffering from both tuberculosis and meningitis. He died during the night of 16 April 1989 in the hospital wing of Fresnes Prison.

Only Mathurin was tried for the first nine attacks and murders, receiving a life sentence, plus 18 years without parole, but was released in January 2009.

== Film references ==
The 1994 film J'ai pas sommeil (I Can't Sleep) by director Claire Denis was based on the Paulin case.

== Bibliography ==
- VKY, "Thierry Paulin: Une Tragédie Noire", Editions Canaan, Paris, 2022 ISBN 979-8887573403

== See also ==
- Jacques Coetzee - a fellow drag performer who also committed murders with an accomplice
- List of French serial killers
- List of serial killers by number of victims
