= Jacques Coetzee and John Frank Brown =

South African serial killers

Jacques Coetzee
- Undated photograph of Coetzee, used in the press while he was still a fugitive
- Born: Samuel Jacques Coetzee; 1971; Johannesburg, Gauteng Province, South Africa
- Died: 31 April 1997 (aged 26); Boksburg Prison, Boksburg, Gauteng Province, South Africa
- Other names: "The Cross-Dressing Killer"; Deon; Kimberley; JC

Details
- Victims: 5
- Span of crimes: 1993–1995
- Country: South Africa
- State: Gauteng
- Date apprehended: 13 April 1996

John Frank Brown
- Born: 1963 (age 62–63); Johannesburg, Gauteng Province, South Africa
- Other name: "The Cross-Dressing Killer"
- Convictions: Murder x1 Accessory to murder x4
- Penalty: Life imprisonment (Richter murder); 60 years (other murders); 15 years (robbery); 4 years (possession of illegal firearms and ammunition)

Details
- Victims: 5
- Span of crimes: 1993–1995
- Country: South Africa
- State: Gauteng
- Date apprehended: October 1995

Samuel Jacques Coetzee (1971 – 31 April 1997) and John Frank Brown (born 1963), collectively known as The Cross-Dressing Killers, were a pair of South African serial killers who murdered four men and one teenage boy in the Johannesburg area from 1993 to 1995. The pair's nickname comes from Coetzee's part-time job as a drag queen.

Both men were arraigned for the crimes, but Coetzee killed himself ten days after their trial began. Consequently, Brown was convicted on one murder charge and four counts of accessory to murder, for which he was given a life term.

== Coetzee's early life ==
Samuel Jacques Coetzee, often referred to by his middle name, was born in 1971 as one of two children born into a middle-class family living in Johannesburg. He lost his father at three years old, and by the age of six, he refused to play with other young boys, instead preferring to play with his sister's dolls. His mother expressed concern at this behaviour and contacted a psychologist, but was assured that this was the result of psychological trauma due to his father's death.

Unbeknownst to his family members, Coetzee secretly wished to become a woman, and had even taken growth hormones to develop breasts. He would drop out of school and run away from home at age 17, but soon returned and was conscripted into the Army. Coetzee reportedly did not handle the service well, and in 1989, he attempted to commit suicide by overdosing on pills.

=== Meeting Brown ===
While recovering in the hospital, Coetzee confessed to his mother that he wanted to be a woman, which she was unable to accept. After he recovered, he left home again and moved into his own apartment, working as a salesman for the Automobile Association of South Africa for a brief period of time. He frequently brought home strangers to have sex with, and in early 1993, he brought home 30-year-old John Frank Brown, a Johannesburg native who had recently lost his job at a local bank. After engaging in intercourse, the pair grew fond of one another and Brown soon moved in with Coetzee.

Not long after, Brown would become physically abusive towards his partner, but Coetzee refused to break off the relationship due to his sadomasochistic tendencies. The pair were often seen cruising around gay bars in Johannesburg and Germiston, where Coetzee garnered a reputation for his performances as a drag queen. Using both male and female aliases, he managed to win several beauty contests and was considered "gorgeous" by attendees. Brown was reportedly either jealous or disapproving of these activities, but did not attempt to convince him to quit, as the revenue Coetzee earned from his performances and his second job as a hairdresser benefitted them both.

== Murders ==
The pair's first murder took place on 30 August 1993, when Coetzee and Brown met 35-year-old drifter Chris Anderson. They invited him back to their apartment, where Coetzee had sex with the man while Brown watched. However, Brown became angry when Coetzee allowed Anderson to perform sexual acts that he himself was not allowed to do, prompting him to grab a nearby piece of drilling equipment and stab Anderson in the neck. In order to finish him off, Brown got a tie and strangled him to death. The pair then took his body and dumped it on a gravel road near Atteridgeville.

On 4 November, Coetzee and Brown were at a café in Johannesburg when they came across a 30-year-old man and a 15-year-old boy whom they did not know the names of. The strangers asked them for money, and both men offered to have sex back at their apartment. The strangers agreed, and after having sex with Coetzee and Brown, they were driven to a farm near Heidelberg to sort out the payment. An argument about money arose, which caused Coetzee and Brown to subsequently shoot, stab and strangle both of their companions before discarding their bodies in the nearby veld.

On 1 September 1995, Coetzee and Brown were having sex at a house in Roodepoort when the latter noticed that someone was spying on them through a window. It turned out to be 27-year-old gardener Avhewngi Robert Bele, whom they invited to join them. Bele accepted and had sex with Coetzee, but after some time, Brown became angry and strangled him. After making sure that he was dead, he cut off his genitals. They then dumped the body and the severed genitalia in the veld near Krugersdorp.

Three weeks later, on 22 September, Coetzee and Brown were walking in a park when 32-year-old Robert Farrel Richter approached them. He propositioned to have sex with them and both men accepted, whereupon he drove them to his home in Edenvale. Richter and Coetzee then had sex, with the former asking to be tied to his bed. Sensing an opportunity, the pair tied him up and then proceeded to strangle him with a karate belt. Coetzee and Brown then stole a gun, some household items and his car, and left the area.

== Brown's confession and Coetzee's arrest ==
Less than a month after killing Richter, Brown was arrested for stealing a pistol and breaking into the house of Cheryl van Straaten, an acquaintance who had housed both him and Coetzee. Whilst serving his prison sentence, he contacted Inspector Ronald Spanjers and spontaneously confessed to the murders he and Coetzee had committed.

After spending a couple of months verifying his claims, investigators issued an arrest warrant for Coetzee, who had recently been paroled on charges of car theft. As a wanted fugitive, photographs of him were released to the press so the public could aid in his capture. On 13 April 1996, Coetzee was arrested at a house in Turffontein. After undergoing psychiatric examinations at the Sterkfontein Psychiatric Hospital, both were found to be sane and able to stand trial. They were remanded in the Germiston court on 16 April, and set to stand five days later.

== Trial, suicide, and convictions ==
At the start of the trial, both Coetzee and Brown pleaded not guilty and accused each other of committing the killings in a bid to absolve themselves of guilt. Ten days later, on 31 April, Coetzee overdosed on pills in his cell at the Boksburg Prison, leaving behind a suicide note addressed to Brown stating that he did not want to live anymore.

Regardless of Coetzee's death, Brown's trial resumed. Shortly afterwards, he changed his plea to guilty. As a result, he was convicted of Richter's murder, on four counts of accessory to murder to the remaining murders, aggravated robbery and illegal possession of firearms and ammunition. Despite this, he continued to claim that he never killed anyone, claiming that Coetzee had blackmailed him into helping to dispose of the bodies, otherwise, he would inform his new employers that he had defrauded them.

The sentencing judge stated that he did not believe Brown's claims, but admitted that he could provide no concrete evidence that he was directly involved in the other four murders besides Richter's. Brown was subsequently given a life term, which he continues to serve to this day.

== See also ==
- Thierry Paulin - another drag performer who also committed murders with an accomplice
- List of serial killers in South Africa

== Bibliography ==
- Micki Pistorius (3 October 2012). Strangers On The Street - Serial homicide in South Africa. Penguin Random House South Africa. ISBN 978-0143527176.
