= Mukosi Freddy Mulaudzi =

South African serial killer

- Born: 1962 (age 63–64); Maelula, Limpopo, South Africa
- Other name: "The Limpopo Serial Killer"
- Conviction: Murder
- Penalty: 11 life sentences

Details
- Victims: 13
- Span of crimes: 1990–2006
- Country: South Africa
- State: Limpopo
- Date apprehended: July 2006

Mukosi Freddy Mulaudzi (born 1962), known as The Limpopo Serial Killer, is a South African robber, rapist and serial killer who murdered a total of 13 people from 1990 to 2006, until his capture in July 2006. He was given 11 life sentences for his crimes.

== Murders ==
Mulaudzi, who was initially imprisoned for two separate murders and an armed robbery committed in 1990, managed to break out of the Baviaanspoort Prison in Pretoria in 1996. Ever since then, he started committing crimes, beginning in 2004. During that year, he attempted to murder thrice, broke into houses two times, and committed two armed robberies and assaults twice, all committed in the Siloam and Levubu areas.

Onwards, from 2005 to 2006, he started committing violent murders, and among his victims were:

- 19-year-old Ndivhuwo Winnity Tshilimandila, who was raped before being killed, as well as her three cousins: Nyadzeni (14), Shumani (10) and Levhalesani Maxwell Sivhugwana (7), who were all hacked to death at their home in Thohoyandou.
- 30-year-old Phophi Tracy Radzilani, was killed with a sharp object in her house, as well as her children, Rotondwa (7) and Moses Mushiana (5), who were burned alive in their bedroom in Tshedza village. Household items were also stolen.
- Shonisani Thinandavha, killed in July 2006 at Mulodi, had her breast, right hand, left ear and upper lip sliced off.

Soon after killing Thinandavha, Mulaudzi was captured by the police while trying to hide in an unused refrigerator.

== Trial and sentence ==
In October 2006, Mulaudzi briefly appeared before the court, but his case was moved to 15 November, as new charges were connected to him by authorities, according to Superintendent Motlafela Mojapelo. Mulaudzi refused to confess and often caused scenes in the courtroom; in one instance, threatening to sleep during the proceedings if his wife, Takalani Florence Nethengwe (charged with possession of stolen goods), and son were not released, and in another, alleged that the police investigator had bribed him with money and phone cards so he would confess. Eventually, he was convicted of the most charges, with Judge Godfrey Hetisani giving him 11 sentences.

== See also ==
- List of serial killers in South Africa
- List of serial killers by number of victims
