= Themba Vilakazi =

South African serial killer

- Themba Vilakazi c. 2016
- Born: 1981 or 1982 (age 44–45); Soshanguve, Pretoria, South Africa
- Other names: "The Railway Killer" "666"
- Status: Incarcerated
- Conviction: Murder (x3)
- Penalty: Life imprisonment + 36 years

Details
- Victims: 3–5 killed 1 survived
- Span of crimes: 2005–2012
- Country: South Africa
- State: Gauteng
- Weapon: Knives
- Date apprehended: 2013

Themba "666" Vilakazi (born 1981–1982), also known as The Railway Killer, is a South African serial killer and satanist who murdered at least three black males along the railways of Pretoria between July and November 2005. His modus operandi typically consisted of undressing his victims, excessively stabbing them to the point of death, and taking their shoes. Although he claimed the murders were motivated by satanism, experts disputed this and alleged that they were sexually motivated.

In 2013, he was arrested for a rape he committed the previous year, and was subsequently connected to the murders through DNA. Two years later, he pleaded guilty to three murders and was sentenced to life imprisonment as well as an additional 36 years.

== Personal life ==
Vilakazi was born between 1981 and 1982 in Soshanguve. Little is known about his childhood. He dropped out of school in grade 10, was not married, did not have any children, and was unemployed at the time of his arrest. At some point, he got "666" and "satanic" tattooed on his forehead. He also had several other satanic tattoos on his chest and back.

== Crimes ==
=== Murders ===
In July 2005, Vilakazi allegedly murdered Moses Cibi, a black man, by stabbing him 17 times in the left side of the chest. Although the man died on the grass next to the railway, Vilakazi dragged his body onto the train tracks and stole his shoes before fleeing the scene. Cibi's body was discovered after it was hit by a train. Investigators initially believed his death to have been accidental or a suicide until they realised the nature of the wounds. The man's clothes were found in a bush nearby, and there were no stab wounds through the clothing, meaning that Cibi had been undressed prior to the stabbing.

On 23 July 2005, another body was found beside train tracks at the Belle Ombre Plaza. The victim, an unknown man, died from 54 stab wounds to the chest, back, and arm. The victim's clothes had been found at the scene, but not on him, and there had been no stab wounds through the clothes. His shoes were also missing. The phrase "7 left" was written in red on a sleeper next to the body. At the time, detectives were uncertain whether the message was written by the perpetrator or if it was unrelated to the case. Vilakazi later confessed to being behind the message, claiming to have written it because he wanted to murder seven more people.

On 11 August 2005, Vilakazi stabbed Michael Mokaba, another black man, 24 times in the neck and top-left chest, killing him. Mokaba tried to run away, but Vilakazi caught up to him, stripped him of his clothes, and murdered him. His body was discovered near the Pretoria Zoo, over the road from where the last victim was found. DNA was on the scene, but the authorities could not match it to any known suspects. They also found an area where someone, likely the perpetrator, had been occupying. There, police found a cross and pornographic magazines among other items.

The next victim was a black female sex worker from Sunnyside, whose corpse was found in Brooklyn near the first victim. She had been stabbed in the neck and right shoulder, and her clothes had been strewn about the area. However, due to the victim's gender, investigators are unsure if her murder is linked to Vilakazi, or if it was just coincidental. After detectives investigated the cases and found no leads, the six-person task force was disbanded, and they moved on to other cases.

At 1:00 p.m. on 11 November 2005, Vilakazi fatally stabbed 11-year-old Raipela Aaron Masango in the torso and neck with a knife. Unlike the previous victims, Masango was not undressed and instead found in his school uniform. He was also killed in a different area than the other victims. Because of the dissimilarities, the case was not linked to the others. Investigators found DNA on the knife handle, but they did not test it against the DNA found at the Mokaba crime scene.

=== Rape ===
On 19 October 2012, Vilakazi approached two men and offered to buy them food. One of the men declined the offer, but the other, an 18-year-old, followed Vilakazi. Once they reached a secluded area, Vilakazi threatened the man with a knife and forced him to walk under a bridge, where he robbed him of his phone and money. Afterwards, Vilakazi sodomised him.

== Arrest and prosecution ==
In the winter of 2013, Vilakazi was walking when he saw a policeman heading to work. After he acted suspiciously, the officer searched him and found drugs in his possession. As the policeman walked him to the police station, Vilakazi's rape victim, who happened to be in the area, alerted the officer that Vilakazi raped him. The criminal's DNA was then taken, and he was subsequently connected to both the rape and the murders. He then confessed to his crimes, claiming that the devil ordered him to kill people. However, the occult unit of the police department later interviewed him and concluded that the murders were not satanically motivated. A mental evaluation also determined that he did not suffer from any mental illness.

Vilakazi was charged with the unidentified man's murder, Mokaba's murder, and Masango's murder. He entered a guilty plea, stating, "there are two kinds of people on Earth; those bearing the mark of the lamb, and those with the beast's sign. I receive instructions from the beast on who to kill. I received instructions from the underworld to kill the three people which I then complied with." At court, he was sentenced to life imprisonment for Masango's murder and 18 years each for the adults' murders. The judge also ordered him to attend psychotherapy and a sex offender programme in prison.

== See also ==
- List of serial killers in South Africa
