= Brydon Brandt =

South African serial killer

- Born: 15 April 1964 (age 62); Welkom, Free State, South Africa
- Years active: 1989–1997
- Status: Incarcerated
- Convictions: Murder (x4); Attempted murder Assault; 5 other crimes
- Penalty: 4 Life sentences

Details
- Victims: 4–5
- Country: South Africa
- State: Eastern Cape
- Date apprehended: 17 September 1997

Brydon Brandt (born 15 April 1964) is a South African serial killer who murdered at least four people in the Eastern Cape between 1989 and 1997. He first murdered two prostitutes after picking them up from bars in Port Elizabeth, then a female roommate in 1996. The next year, he murdered a male roommate during an argument and was arrested after other residents of the boarding house alerted the police. He subsequently confessed to all of the murders and pleaded guilty to them in 1999. He is now serving four life sentences.

== Early life ==
Brandt was born on 15 April 1964 in Welkom, the sixth of seven children. He alleged that his mother had undiagnosed mental illnesses including depression, and that she breastfed him until the age of nine. He also claimed his father was a violent man who encouraged his sons to fight. Brydon, being the youngest son, did not fare well in these brawls. To discipline them, his father reportedly tied his children to a chair and beat them with a sjambok. He abused his wife as well. When Brydon turned 10, he said his second oldest brother began to molest him, and his oldest brother forced the younger brothers to engage in incest with their sisters. The family kept to themselves, and the children were not allowed to make friends with other children outside the household. The Department of Welfare eventually caught on to the abuse, and several of the Brandt children, including Brydon, were removed from the household.

Brandt was sent to an industrial school, where he claimed he was sodomised by other boys. He also got in trouble for assaulting a teacher. After completing grade 10, he became a soldier for the South African Defense Force (SADF). In the army, he said he was part of the Military Police, who are responsible for supervising other soldiers and investigating crimes and disciplinary problems within the departments of defence.

By 1984, Brandt was 20 and unemployed. In March of that year, he was arrested in Kroonstad for crimen injuria and received a four-month suspended sentence. In October, he was caned for stealing jewellery. In 1986, he received a three-month suspended sentence or a fine of R300 for stealing a bicycle. He moved to Port Elizabeth with a brother the following year and, within weeks of arriving, he was fined R50 for hitting someone with a brick. In 1988, he was fined R100 for malicious damage to property after breaking a mirror in the hotel room he was occupying. The next year, he was pulled over while drunk driving and sentenced to 50 days in prison or an R50 fine.

== Murders ==
On 9 December 1989, Brandt met Jean Natlazo, a prostitute, at Palmerston Nightclub. The two talked for a while before deciding to go to a municipal building, where they engaged in sex. When the act was over, they reportedly argued over how much money he owed Natlazo. Brandt then became aggravated and fatally stabbed her with a knife. The following day, Natlozo's body was found naked below the waist and lying on her back on the building's stairs. Her autopsy found that she had severe lacerations to the vagina, indicating she may have been raped with a foreign object.

On 5 January 1990, Brandt met Sarie Schoeman and two other prostitutes at the Station Bar. After drinking together, the three women got into his car, and he drove them to a roadside table along Marine Drive. There, they discussed prices in exchange for sex acts. Brandt chose to pay for Schoeman's services, and the two drove off, leaving the other two prostitutes by the roadside. Brandt eventually pulled over in a remote area, where he inserted a wine bottle into Schoeman's vagina. He then struck her on the head with a rock, fracturing her skull and killing her. Schoeman's friends, who were still at the table, saw Brandt drive past them again, except that time, he was alone and there was a dent in his car's bumper.

Sensing something was amiss, the two women walked up Marine Drive to look for Schoeman, and they found her body along the road shortly afterwards, hidden in shrubbery. After removing the wine bottle from her vagina, they fled the scene and did not report the murder to the police. Brandt later returned to scene. Agitated that the victim's body had been disturbed, he put her in his car and drove around with the corpse for some time until he returned to the original scene, dragged her body further into the woods, and inserted a stick into her vagina. Schoeman's body later was rediscovered by homeless people. Investigators located her two friends, and they agreed to be interviewed after being assured that their line of work would not cause them legal trouble. They provided a vague description of the offender, which did not result in any leads, and Schoeman's murder remained unsolved.

In 1991, Brandt committed a burglary, during which he nearly killed the homeowner. Convicted of housebreaking and attempted murder, he served five years in prison until being released in 1996. That year, he relocated to a boarding house in the Eastern Cape. He soon became employed as a bodyguard for a local doctor after convincing people he was a private investigator. He claimed that the doctor ordered him to assassinate two people, but he refused, instead offering his would-be victims a place to live. He became roommates with a woman named Julia, and her boyfriend. However, he quickly evicted the boyfriend due to his poor hygiene habits. Late that year, Brandt claimed he saved a young boy planning to run away from his father; allowing the child to live with him instead.

On 9 December 1996, he alleged that he and the boy had been asleep when Julia burst into the room, drunk. He said he asked her to leave, but she refused, causing them to have an argument. During the fight, Brandt claimed that she fell, broke her neck, and died. However, it is more likely that he strangled her to death. He later put her corpse in a green bin bag and dumped it behind Feather Market Hall. The boy who had been living with Brandt was never identified, and Brandt said he left soon after Julia's killing.

By September 1997, Brandt moved to a new boarding house and became roommates with 52-year-old Clinton Dean Morris. The two were drinking buddies who got along well. However, on the night of 17 September 1997, they got into an argument over money. Brandt ended up strangling Morris to death. He then cut up the mattress he killed him on, and then dumped it, along with Morris' body, into a large dustbin outside of the boarding house. Other residents heard the pair's scuffle and quickly found Morris' body upon searching for him. They immediately called the police, who found Brandt walking along the street in bloodstained clothes. They arrested him without hesitation.

== Legal proceedings ==
Five days after his arrest, Brandt made a full confession to Morris' murder to a magistrate. He also confessed to the three other murders, which he had not been linked to yet. Additionally, he confessed to a fifth murder: that of a prostitute in 1996. He said he left the body in Donkin Park, but there were no records of a body being discovered there. His psychiatric assessments showed that he shared many characteristics of a person with antisocial personality disorder.

In May 1999, he pleaded guilty to the murders of Natlazo, Schoeman, Julia, and Morris and received four life sentences.

== See also ==
- List of serial killers in South Africa
- Foreign object insertion
