= Simon Majola =

South African serial killer

- Born: 1968 (age 57–58); Mofolo, Gauteng, South Africa
- Other name: "The Bruma Lake Killer"
- Conviction: Murder
- Penalty: Life imprisonment x8

Details
- Victims: 8+
- Span of crimes: 2000–2001
- Country: South Africa
- State: Gauteng

Simon Majola (born 1968), known as The Bruma Lake Killer, is a South African robber and serial killer who, with accomplice Themba Nkosi, was responsible for the killings of at least eight people in the vicinity of the Bruma Lake in Bruma, Gauteng. Majola was given eight life sentences, and is currently imprisoned.

== Biography ==
Simon Majola was born in Mofolo, Soweto in 1968. He was married and had two children.

== Partnership ==
Majola, a married man with two children, had previous convictions for housebreaking, assault and theft before the murders. While partying in Hillbrow, he struck up a friendship with Themba Isaac Nkosi, of Vosloorus. Their relationship quickly turned into a criminal one, with Majola and Nkosi robbing and killing people not only in Bruma Lake, but also in Rhodes Park, Bezuidenhout Park and Observatory Rift Park.

== Murders ==
Between April 2000 and February 2001, couples' bodies were turning up in the Bruma Lake. Initially considered to be drug-related, the victims were apparently robbed of all cash, jewelry, bank cards, clothes and cell phones, before stones or bricks were tied to their feet and subsequently, they were drowned. Majola and Nkosi always worked as a team, threatening their targets with knives and guns. They always attacked people in the early evenings or late at night at party or picnic spots, while the victims were in their cars. Two of the bodies were in such an advanced state of decomposition that they were unrecognisable, with police additionally believing that they could have been foreigners.

Despite these events terrifying the locals, causing shops to close down and business losing much revenue, a majority of the incidents were never reported to the authorities, as some of the couples attacked were either gay or reluctant to come forward. With the lack of any kind of evidence, including fingerprints, the case proved to be particularly difficult, even when it was handed down to Superintendent Piet Byleveld, a sleuth noted for his successful rate of solving cases.

== Capture and trial ==
On February 8, 2001, two men were arrested in Kensington for the illegal possession of firearms. Those two men were Majola and Nkosi. When notified of the arrests, Byleveld immediately drove to the station in order to move the criminals to Brixton. While in a separate car with Nkosi, he noticed the muscular man, who not so long ago was very cocky and considered his arrest as a joke, suddenly had begun to tremble. Later, when questioned separately, both criminals confessed to their crimes, including others of which they weren't suspected: including people robbed in Rhodes Park; the May 15, 2000 murder of a Baptist preacher and the murder of a mutual friend during a failed break-in. Majola and Nkosi also killed any associate who discovered what they were up to, killing them in the same way that they did with the other victims. Byleveld managed to connect them to at least 21 murders and attempted murders.

The duo were brought to trial in September 2002. During the process, Nkosi's mother, Ruth Tshehlo, pleaded to the court to be lenient with her "first-born" child, as he was reliable. Meanwhile, Majola denied all charges, blaming his convictions on white supremacy. Neither criminal's tactics worked, as Majola was convicted on eight counts of murder, 19 of armed robbery, and 5 of attempted murder; while Nkosi was found guilty of 4 murder charges, 14 of armed robbery, five of attempted murder and of assaulting his pregnant then-girlfriend, Jabulile Lushaba, to whom he had bragged of being the "Bruma Lake Killer". Both of them were sentenced to life imprisonment.

== See also ==
- List of serial killers in South Africa
