= Asande Baninzi =

South African serial killer

- Born: 1983 (age 42–43); South Africa
- Convictions: Murder, rape, armed robbery
- Penalty: 19 life sentences plus 189 years' imprisonment

Details
- Victims: 14–18
- Span of crimes: June – August 2001
- Country: South Africa
- States: Cape Flats, Cape Province

Asande Baninzi (born 1983) is a South African spree killer.

Baninzi claimed 14 lives between June and August 2001. He was convicted of fourteen murders, four rapes of hijacking victims and two armed robberies. In addition to 19 life sentences, he was sentenced to 189 years' imprisonment.

In order to gain money for drugs, Baninzi claimed in his plea statement that the mass killings, rapes, and hijackings took place between June and August 2001.

When authorities cornered his accomplice, Mtutuzeli Nombewu, popularly known as "Wox", in a home in Gugulethu, he shot himself to avoid arrest.

Baninzi, who is currently serving four life sentences for the murder of a family of four living in Delft, in the Cape Flats, pleaded guilty to all his convictions.

== See also ==
- List of serial killers in South Africa
- List of serial killers by number of victims
