= Gamal Lineveldt =

South African serial killer

- Born: Gamal Salie Lineveldt; 1919; Wynberg, Cape Town, South Africa
- Died: 1942 (aged 22–23); Pretoria Central Prison, South Africa
- Other names: Gamat Salie Lineveldt; Salie Lingevelt
- Status: Executed by hanging
- Conviction: Murder
- Penalty: Death

Details
- Victims: 4
- Span of crimes: 1940–1941
- Country: South Africa
- State: Western Cape
- Date apprehended: 14 March 1941

Gamal Salie Lineveldt (1919–1942), also known as Gamat Salie Lineveldt, and Salie Lingevelt, was a South African serial killer and rapist. He was responsible for the rape and murder of four women in Cape Town, South Africa.

Lineveldt's first murder victim was Ethel Marais, on 3 October 1940. He then killed Dorothy Marie Tarling on 22 October, and Evangeline Bird on 11 November. His last murder was of May Overton Hoets on 25 November. In court, Lineveldt plead guilty to all four murders.

Marais was found, still alive but unable to speak, in "the field off Brockhurst Road, Lansdowne". She was taken to hospital, where she later died.

Tarling was found lying dead on the floor of her house in Wynberg.

Bird was attacked in broad daylight, on the stoep (porch) of her house in Wetton Avenue, Lansdowne. She was found almost immediately and taken to hospital, where she died the next afternoon. The entire attack had taken place in the span of about five minutes.

Hoets was found lying dead on her bed in her house on Thornhill Road, Rondebosch.

At the trial, Dr. I. Gordon (the assistant state pathologist) testified regarding his findings. All four women died of blunt force trauma to the head after being struck with a blunt instrument multiple times. He found evidence that Hoets had been raped, but he did not find any signs of rape when examining Marais and Bird (they may have been assaulted in a way that did not leave physical evidence, or the evidence was inadvertently removed in the course of hospital treatment). In the case of Tarling, the signs he found were inconclusive.

Lineveldt was executed in 1942.

== See also ==
- List of serial killers in South Africa
