= Themba Sukude =

South African serial killer (born 1974)

Themba Anton Sukude
- Born: 16 May 1974 (age 52)
- Other name: "The Newcastle serial killer"
- Status: Incarcerated
- Convictions: Murder (x4); Rape (x2); Aggravated robbery (x2); Malicious damage to property
- Penalty: 5 life sentences + 40 years imprisonment

Details
- Victims: 4 killed; 2+ raped
- Span of crimes: 2004–2005
- Country: South Africa
- State: KwaZulu-Natal
- Weapon: Rocks
- Date apprehended: 8 March 2005

Themba Anton Sukude (born 16 May 1974), also known as the Newcastle serial killer, is a South African serial killer who murdered four men and raped two women in Newcastle's Trim Park between February 2004 and January 2005. His initial modus operandi consisted of targeting couples. He would bludgeon the male with a rock and rape the female. However, he later switched to solely targeting men. He was caught in March 2005 after confessing to a stranger, and convicted of the crimes the following year. He is serving five life sentences as well as an additional 40 years.

== Early life ==
Sukude was born on 16 May 1974. A Zulu speaker, he dropped out of school in grade three. He had a high number of convictions dating back to 1990, but his initial criminal activity was seized about a decade prior to the murders.

== Murders ==
On the night of Valentine's Day 2004, a drunk couple were being intimate with each other in Trim Park when Sukude approached them from behind and hit the male on the head with a rock. He then struck the man a second time, killing him. Afterwards, he focused his attention on the female victim. After slapping her, he dragged her to a ditch 10 metres away and raped her, during which he threatened her with a coffee knife. Once he was finished, he told the surviving victim to get dressed, and he left without stealing anything. The girl subsequently alerted the police to the crime.

At 11:00 p.m. on 27 October 2004, a male taxi driver parked his minibus, retrieved a blanket, and began to engage in sexual activities with his girlfriend. Suddenly, Sukude fatally struck the male once with a rock he found nearby. The woman pleaded with Sukude and tried to get dressed, but he ordered her not to. He then grabbed her hand and repeatedly asked her where the firearm was. The woman, confused, informed him that there was no firearm. Nevertheless, he searched the male's trousers but found nothing. He proceeded to take out his knife, put it around the woman's neck, forced her to walk to another location, and raped her. They then returned to the taxi, and she got dressed as Sukude rummaged through the vehicle. He lit a small fire inside the taxi and stole the woman's purse and two phones before fleeing. After he left, the surviving victim ran away and reported the crime to the authorities. Due to the close proximity to the other attack and similar methods used by the perpetrator, the crimes were immediately linked.

At about midnight on 26 November 2004, Sukude bludgeoned a man to death with a rock along a footpath. The man's injuries were so severe that his face swelled to twice the average size, and his eyes were pushed back into his skull. Since the man's body was missing pants and a shoe, there was speculation that there may have also been a female victim. However, investigators did not find another body in the vicinity, and no female victim ever came forward.

On 7 January 2005, an Indian man left his sister's house. As he walked along the side of the road near the scene of the second attack, Sukude beat him with a rock. The victim was found alive the following morning, but he succumbed to his injuries in the hospital. Like the third victim, his shoe was also missing. A large roll of money was also found next to his head.

== Arrest and prosecution ==
On 8 March 2005, a 68-year-old man walking along the road stopped to have a drink. Sukude walked up to him and asked if he had a light for his cigarette. The two then began to talk to each other. When the topic landed on what he did for a living, Suduke said that although he was unemployed, he did work in the park. When the other man inquired further about this, he explained that when couples engage in sexual activity near the river, he beats the man with a rock, rapes the woman, and robs them. The two then parted ways and the man went to look for his friend, who had a phone. Once he located him, they searched for Sukude and called the police after they found him.

Sukude was subsequently arrested. Although his two rape victims identified him in an identity parade and photographs, he maintained his innocence. Detectives searched his residence, a tent near the crime scenes, and found rotten food and women's clothing. However, none of the clothes belonged to his known rape victims.

Sukude's trial was held in April 2006. The two rape victims testified against him, but there was no direct evidence against Sukude in the two other cases. To combat this, forensic psychologist Gérard Labuschagne used linkage and behavioural analysis to prove that all the murders were connected. The defence did not combat this, as they were concerned with the innocence of their client rather than if the crimes were committed by one offender. On 26 April, Sukude was found guilty on all counts. He was sentenced to five life terms for the four murders and raping a minor. He received an additional 40 years imprisonment for the other rape, two counts of aggravated robbery, and malicious damage to property. He was the first South African serial killer to be convicted of some murders by solely linkage analysis. He will be eligible for parole in 2031, when he is 57-years-old.

== See also ==
- Sexual violence in South Africa
- List of serial killers in South Africa
- Lovers' lane
