= Jack Mogale =

South African serial killer

- Born: Madumetsa Jack Mogale; September 1968 (age 58); South Africa
- Other name: West-End Serial Killer
- Convictions: Murder, kidnapping, rape
- Penalty: Life imprisonment

Details
- Victims: 16
- Span of crimes: 2008–2009
- Country: South Africa
- Date apprehended: 2009

Madumetsa Jack Mogale (born September 1968), dubbed the West-End Serial Killer by police, is a South African serial killer who killed 16 people in 2008 and 2009. On 17 February 2011, Mogale was convicted on 52 of 61 charges related to 16 murders, 19 rapes, and nine kidnappings.

== Murders ==
Mogale committed his crimes near his residence in Westonaria and Lenasia, south of Johannesburg. Two women who survived being attacked by him testified at trial that he had claimed to be a Zion Christian Church (ZCC) preacher and a prophet.

One woman that was attacked by Mogale testified that he put herbs into her vagina and claimed that she needed to have sex with him to exorcise 'evil spirits' from her. Mogale said that they were having an affair and that the sex was consensual.

Another woman testified that he took her in his car to a veld, where he attacked her. She lost consciousness, and when she woke up a day later, her jaw was dislocated and maggots were crawling in her wounds.

Mogale said that he "lose[s] control" around women and he "kill[s] them if they don’t give [him] what [he] want[s]."

== Investigation and trial ==
Mogale plead not guilty to all the charges against him. Johannesburg High Court Judge Frans Kgomo sentenced Mogale to 16 life sentences for each of the counts of murder, four life sentences for raping some women more than once, and 20 years each for 15 counts of rape. During his trial Mogale repeatedly claimed that the police, witnesses, and his wife were conspiring against him, which Kgomo called "far-fetched" and "fallacious".

== See also ==
- List of serial killers in South Africa
- List of serial killers by number of victims
