= Johannes Mashiane =

South African serial killer

- Born: South Africa
- Died: 1989; South Africa
- Cause of death: Hit by a bus (possible suicide)
- Other name: The Beast of Atteridgeville

Details
- Victims: 13
- Span of crimes: 1982–1989
- Country: South Africa
- Location: Atteridgeville

Notes
- 12 victims killed in 1988–1989

Johannes Mashiane, nicknamed The Beast of Atteridgeville, was a South African rapist and serial killer active in the 1980s. He killed 13 people in Atteridgeville, South Africa, before he died in 1989.

Mashiane's first victim was his girlfriend, whom he murdered in 1982. He was sentenced to five years in prison for her death. After he was released, he raped and murdered 12 young boys by stoning or strangulation.

Mashiane was being chased by police in the Pretoria suburb of Marabastad when he jumped underneath a bus. One victim is known to have survived Mashiane's attention.

== See also ==
- List of serial killers in South Africa
- List of serial killers by number of victims
