= Sleepy Hollow Killer =

Unidentified South African rapist and serial killer

- Other name: Sleepy Hollow Murderer

Details
- Victims: 13–16+
- Span of crimes: 1990s–2007
- Country: South Africa
- States: KwaZulu-Natal, possibly also Free State and Eastern Cape

The Sleepy Hollow Killer is the name of an unidentified South African rapist and serial killer, thought to be responsible for the rapes and murders of at least 13 women, most likely sex workers, around Pietermaritzburg and the Midlands of KwaZulu-Natal. His signature was to strangle his victims using their panties, a characteristic shared with the murders of three prostitutes in 2007, who are also considered possible victims.

== Murders ==
In the late 1990s, several women were raped and then strangled with their own panties in Pietermaritzburg, with their bodies later being found near the N3 Highway. In 2001, authorities began an inquest into the murders, exhuming seven of the murdered women's corpses from graves in Mountain Rise and Mpophomeni, in an attempt to identify them through facial reconstruction. However, the investigation led nowhere, and it closed that same year.

=== 2007 killings ===
Between February and October 2007, the bodies of three black women were found near the N3 Highway's vicinity. The first victim was found behind the ML Sultan High School, the second near Liberty Midlands Mall in June and the last was found in October between Hilton and Peter Brown Drive. Like the 1990s victims, they were raped and strangled with their panties, the only difference being that they were burned severely after death. Aside from them, bodies bearing the same signature were reportedly discovered from places as far as Bloemfontein and Port Elizabeth.

Superintendent Henry Budhram later announced that a special task team, supervised by Senior Superintendent Gops Govender, would investigate the murders and examine all the circumstances, modus operandi and material evidence for all cases.

== Possible suspect ==
On 30 January 2008, a 32-year-old man was arrested in Mpophomeni for allegedly murdering a 30-year-old woman near Howick, in a small settlement called Curry's Post. Her body was found by a passer-by in a forest, partially naked, with a belt tying her legs and hands and open wounds to her head. It was also alleged that she might have been raped.

When questioned about the case, Superintendent Budhram said he did not believe this death was linked to the victims of the Sleepy Hollow Killer.

== See also ==
- List of fugitives from justice who disappeared
- List of serial killers in South Africa
