= Richard Nyauza =

South African serial killer (born 1970)

- Born: 1970 (age 55–56)
- Status: Incarcerated
- Convictions: Murder (x16); Attempted murder; Rape (x4); Robbery (x3)
- Penalty: 16 life sentences + 140 years imprisonment

Details
- Victims: 18–19 killed (including two unborn children); 2 survived
- Span of crimes: 2002–2006
- Country: South Africa
- Date apprehended: September 2006

Richard Jabulani Nyauza (born 1970) is a South African serial killer and rapist who murdered 16 women in and around the Rossway Quarry. Shortly after becoming infected with HIV in 2002, Nyauza murdered his first five victims near Olievenhoutbosch. Later that year, he was arrested for attempting to rape a child, but was released in 2005 after being found not guilty. Weeks later, he began murdering women again in an area about 2.8 kilometres away from the area the original murders occurred in. Nyauza murdered 11 more women until his arrest in 2006. Following his trial, he was found guilty and given 16 life sentences as well as an additional 140 years imprisonment.

== Murders ==
After a woman infected him with HIV, Nyauza grew a hatred towards women, believing that they did not deserve to live.

Between January and September 2002, the bodies of five unidentified black women were discovered along the Riet River outside of Olievenhoutbosch township in Pretoria. Investigators initially believed the murders were connected to the "Highwayman" serial killer, who was identified as Elias Chauke in November 2002. However, Chauke was ruled out as the perpetrator after it was learned that he had been imprisoned for unrelated reasons during the quarry murder series. Investigators soon exhausted all leads and the case became inactive.

Shortly after murdering his fifth victim, Nyauza was arrested for attempting to rape his girlfriend's nine-year-old daughter. In November 2005, he was found not guilty and released. Five weeks later, he resumed committing crimes. The body of his sixth victim was found on 2 January 2006. Although she had been strangled as opposed to Nyauza's previous method of bludgeoning his victims, the killing was quickly linked to the others because of its close proximity to the 2002 murders. A task force was formed in May to apprehend the perpetrator after five more victims had been found.

Nyauza lured his victims, all black women, by offering them jobs. He then murdered them, and sometimes raped them, after the two reached a secluded location. As time passed, Nyauza switched from prominently bludgeoning his victims with stones, and in one case, a plank of wood, to strangling them. In some cases, he stabbed victims with a screwdriver. In every case, Nyauza took the murder weapon with him rather than leaving it at the crime scene. 14 of the 16 victims were found fully or partially naked, and Nyauza's semen was recovered from four of them.

=== Surviving victim ===
On 17 August 2006, Nyauza noticed a pregnant woman, on her way to Botswana, standing outside of the police station in Magaliesburg police station. After pulling up next to her in his blue bakkie, he offered her a ride, to which she accepted. Nyauza first drove to a farm to drop off ostrich feed, and afterwards, the two drove down a dirt road. Suddenly, he stopped his bakkie, got out of the vehicle, and stabbed the woman in the chest with a screwdriver upon opening the passenger door. He proceeded to rob her, tie her up with her own shoelaces, close the vehicle's door, and drove until they reached a ditch. Once at the ditch, Nyauza forced the woman out of his vehicle and told her to look him in the eyes. She pleaded with him, telling him to stop because he had already taken her belongings. Nyauza ordered her to shut up and stabbed her in the forehead. As she screamed in pain, he scolded her for making noise. He twisted her nightgown around her neck and began to strangle her. Nyauza then stabbed her in the back of the neck, removed her undergarments, and put a blanket over her before driving off. The woman managed to survive, but she lost her baby, eyesight in her left eye, and the use of one of her hands as a result of the attack.

=== List of murders ===
#	Name	Body found	Cause of death
1	Unidentified	13 January 2002	Undetermined
2	Unidentified	22 April 2002	Blunt force trauma to the head
3	Unidentified	13 June 2002	Blunt force trauma
4	Unidentified	21 June 2002	Blunt force trauma to the liver
5	Unidentified	3 September 2002	Undetermined; possibly drowning
6	Unidentified	2 January 2006	Strangulation and blunt force trauma to the chest
7	Unidentified	8 January 2006	Undetermined
8	Unidentified	27 February 2006	Drowning and strangulation
9	Unidentified	21 April 2006	Undetermined
10	Evelyn Dube	21 April 2006	Undetermined; possibly strangulation
11	Mollin Gunduza	30 April 2006	Strangulation
12	Unidentified	29 May 2006	Undetermined
13	Selina Mahlangu	31 July 2006	Undetermined; possibly stab wounds
14	Unidentified	31 July 2006	Stab wounds
15	Elizabeth Mabasa	1 September 2006	Strangulation and blunt force trauma
16	Rosina Mosvana	17 September 2006	Strangulation

== Arrest and legal proceedings ==
On 5 September 2006, investigators realized that there had been a match between the DNA found on the fifth victim and Nyauza. Nyauza's DNA had been taken after his arrest for attempted rape in 2002. At the time, this was not typical in South Africa, as DNA was only used for case investigation, and no DNA had been left on the victim. A short time later, the DNA found on the fifth victim had also been entered into the database. However, it was not required that anyone monitor the system at that time, so the match had gone unchecked for four years.

Police gathered outside of Nyauza's house, waiting for him to come home to arrest him. Nyauza had taken cell phones from several of his victims. One of the phones, Selina Mahlangu's, had still been pinging off cell towers in Olievenhoutbosch. They began tracking the phone and noticed it travelling closer and closer to Nyauza's house, indicating that he was close by. Police then saw two men walking towards the home, Nyauza and his brother. Nyauza was soon detained and placed in a police car. At the same time, police searched his home and discovered more items belonging to his victims. In custody, Nyauza confessed to all of his crimes. Additionally, he claimed to have murdered a man during a contract killing, as well as two robberies. However, no evidence of this was found.

Nyauza pleaded not guilty, and his trial began on 23 October 2007. A total of 18 witnesses testified at his trial, one of whom was his surviving victim. As the victim recounted her attack, Nyauza would not stop laughing at her.

Although he had pointed seven crime scenes out to the police, Nyauza claimed that the police had drugged him instead of giving him his HIV medication. Police had recorded Nyauza pointing out the crime scenes, and he showed no visible signs of intoxication, so the judge dismissed his claim. When asked why his semen was found in several of the victims, he claimed that it was because he was a man of exceptional sexual prowess who slept with many women. Although there was only direct evidence against Nyauza in eight of the murders, forensic psychologist Gérard Labuschagne used linkage analysis to argue why all 16 cases had to have been committed by the same offender. On 5 November 2007, Nyauza was found guilty of 16 counts of murder, one count of attempted murder, four counts of rape, and three counts of robbery. He was given 16 life sentences for the murders and an additional 140 years in prison for the rest of his crimes.

== See also ==
- List of serial killers in South Africa
- List of serial killers by number of victims
