= Ndivhuwo Ntsieni =

South African serial killer

Ndivhuwo Godfrey Ntsieni
- Born: 1989 or 1990 (age 36–37)
- Other name: Univen serial killer
- Years active: 2014
- Convictions: Murder (x5); Rape (x4); Robbery (x2)
- Penalty: 9 life sentences + 15 years imprisonment

Details
- Victims: 5
- Country: South Africa
- State: Limpopo
- Weapon: Brick
- Date apprehended: 22 July 2014

Ndivhuwo Godfrey Ntsieni (born c. 1989–1990), also known as the Univen serial killer, is a South African serial killer who raped and murdered five females between March and July 2014 in and around the University of Venda in Limpopo. He targeted both women at the university as well as prepubescent girls, who he kidnapped nearby from their schools. Shortly after he murdered his final victim, the police tracked him down through the cellphones he stole from his victims. He was arrested in July 2014, and given nine life sentences as well as an additional 15 years imprisonment nearly two years later.

== Personal life ==
Ntsieni was a second-year student studying food and science technology at the University of Venda. He rented a five-room house in Golgotha, a section of Thohoyandou. There, he decorated the walls of his room with photos of women, played computer games, and listened to romantic music. According to one of his housemates, he would warn her and other women at the university to be careful, and not to walk alone at night since the area was becoming more dangerous, and killers were operating there.

== Murders ==
- On 14 March 2014, Ntsieni raped and murdered 20-year-old Livhuwani Mmbodi, a first-year agricultural science student, on university premises.
- On 27 April 2014, he raped and strangled 9-year-old Tshililo Ndou to death. On the same day, the girl's grandmother asked Ntsieni if he had seen her. Later, her corpse was found in a yard at Golgotha village, within walking distance of the university.
- On 26 May 2014, he attacked Shudufhadzani "Sandy" Thagisa, a 24-year-old nursing student with a brick, sexually assaulted her, and then stole her student card, cellphone, and hairpin. She was taken to the hospital and discharged two months later, but the health complications she received from the attack persisted. On 4 March 2015, she was taken to Tshilidzini Hospital after complaining about pain and died there.
- On 26 June 2014, he raped and fatally strangled Zwivhuya Mashau, 8, after kidnapping her from her school. Her body was found between two piles of sand just outside the university premises.
- On 18 July 2014, Ntsieni raped and fatally beat 45-year-old Brenda Ndove, a cleaner for the university, with a brick. He then stole her cellphone. Her body was found close to the university's administration block. There was a deep wound on the back of her head from the bludgeoning, but also smaller wounds on her back, suggesting he had moved her body away from the original crime scene.

Ntsieni was arrested on 22 July 2014 at the home he was renting. Investigators identified him as a suspect by tracing his victims' cellphone records.

== Legal proceedings ==
During his first court appearance, more than 1,000 people, mostly university students, protested outside the court, demanding Ntsieni receive a lengthy sentence. At one point, they threatened to gate-crash the courtroom and harm Ntsieni, leading to the police needing to work hard to maintain order. They also needed to remove people from the gallery since they were shoving and pushing people to get a glimpse of Ntsieni's face.

In court, Ntsieni claimed that a man named Rendani asked him to assist him in robbing and killing people and cutting up their flesh to sell. He said that the man gave him R100 as a prepayment and that the money might have had a curse that caused him to murder people. He said since that day, he randomly woke up every night, leading him to believe that the alleged curse caused him to behave uncontrollably while he sleep-walked. Additionally he claimed that the police had beaten him into making a confession, so he should not be held responsible for his crimes.

On 20 May 2016, he was found guilty of five counts of murder, four counts of rape, and two counts of robbery, and given 9 life sentences plus an additional 15 years imprisonment.

== See also ==
- List of serial killers in South Africa
- Sexual violence in South Africa
