= Lorna de Smidt =

South African activist (1943–2022)

- Born: 1943; Kensington, Cape Town, South Africa
- Died: 2022 (aged 78–79); England
- Citizenship: South African; British
- Occupations: Teacher; Activist
- Years active: 1960s–2000s
- Known for: Anti-apartheid activism
- Movement: Black Consciousness Movement

Lorna de Smidt (1943–2022) was a South African-born activist based in England.

== Biography ==
Lorna de Smidt was born in 1943 in Kensington, Cape Town to parents of mixed ancestry. She was raised in Cape Town, South Africa. At the age of four, she was admitted in a primary school, named Trafalgar High School. She completed her graduation from Zonnebloem Teacher Training College in 1960 and subsequently became a teacher.

== Activism ==
In the 1960s, as a part of the Black Consciousness Movement, she became an anti-apartheid activist. After emigrating to England in the 1970s, de Smidt joined the City of London Anti-Apartheid Group and helped organise the weekly protests outside South Africa House in Trafalgar Square. She also worked with the International Defence and Aid Fund (IDAF), raising money for the legal defence of political prisoners and support for their families.

== Exile and career in English ==
After the Soweto riots of 1976 and her illegal marriage to a white man, she became a refugee in England and lived rest of her life there. Between 1983 and 1991, de Smidt worked for the Lewisham Race Equality Unit.

From 2000 to 2005, she worked on a restoration project of South Africa House, at the South African Embassy, London.

== Death ==
She died in England in 2022, aged 78–79. Tributes from former colleagues in the Anti-Apartheid Movement noted her decades of work supporting political prisoners and their families.

== Documentaries ==
De Smidt appeared in and helped research two documentaries on apartheid-era South Africa. Suffer the Children (1988), directed by Peter Davis, examined the impact of apartheid on black children and schools. She also featured in How I'd Love to Feel Free (1989), part of Channel 4’s South Africa Now series, which documented the work of anti-apartheid activists in exile.
