= David Randitsheni =

South African serial killer and rapist

- Born: David Randitsheni; 1964/5; South Africa
- Died: 2009
- Cause of death: Suicide
- Other name: Modimolle Serial Killer
- Convictions: 10 counts of murder 17 counts of rape 18 counts of kidnapping 1 count of indecent assault
- Penalty: 16 life sentences 220 years imprisonment

Details
- Victims: 10
- Span of crimes: 2004–2008
- Country: South Africa
- State: Limpopo

David Randitsheni (1964/65 – 2009) was a South African rapist and serial killer who in 2009 was convicted on 10 counts of murder, 17 counts of rape, 18 counts of kidnapping and one count of indecent assault. He was sentenced to 16 life sentences and 220 years in prison, with the judge stipulating that he could not be considered for parole before serving at least 35 years in prison, by which time he would be 80 years old. Only one of his victims was an adult (a woman); the rest were children.

He committed his crimes over a four-year period from 2004 to 2008 around the town of Modimolle in the Limpopo province.

Randitsheni was found hanging in his prison cell from an apparent suicide shortly after commencing his sentence.

== See also ==
- List of serial killers in South Africa
- List of serial killers by number of victims
