= Peter Roy Barber =

Executed English-South African serial killer

- Born: 1927; Hastings, Sussex, England
- Died: 11 December 1980 (aged 53); Pretoria Central Prison, Pretoria, Gauteng Province, South Africa
- Cause of death: Execution by hanging
- Other name: "The Laughing Killer"
- Conviction: Murder (3 counts)
- Penalty: Death

Details
- Victims: 3–4
- Span of crimes: 1973–1979
- Country: South Africa
- State: KwaZulu-Natal
- Date apprehended: March 5, 1979

Peter Roy Barber (1927 – 11 December 1980), known as the Laughing Killer, was an English-born South African serial killer who murdered two mistresses and a twelve-year-old girl in Pinetown, near Durban, between 1973 and 1979. He was additionally suspected of murdering another mistress but was acquitted of that crime since her body was never found.

Convicted and sentenced to death for his confirmed crimes, Barber later confessed to all four murders in an attempt to have his sentence commuted. This was unsuccessful, and he was executed in 1980.

== Early life ==
Little is known of Peter Roy Barber's early life. Born in 1927 in Hastings, Sussex, he joined the Royal Air Force in 1946, where he served as a batman. Sometime in the 1950s, Barber married a woman, but the union fell through and he moved to Newbury. He opened a bakery business in Kingsclere called Sundriesman, but the venture proved unsuccessful and he was declared bankrupt in December 1955.

=== Affair ===
In 1958, Barber remarried and returned to Hastings. Over the next couple of years, he served as a chairman for the parent–teacher association (PTA) at Sandown Primary School. In 1967, during a PTA meeting, Barber met fellow committee member Irene Helen Jones, a married woman with two children. The pair fell in love and began an extramarital affair, with Barber often visiting the Jones household. He was ill-regarded by Jones's other family members, especially by her son Bryan, who would later claim that Barber often shunned the children and kicked him down the stairs on one occasion.

Aside from his position as PTA chairman, Barber also owned a timber construction business which supplied local greenhouses, garden sheds and pathways. By 1971, he had amassed a debt of £6,000. Tragedy struck Barber's family later that year when his fourteen-year-old son Timothy accidentally hanged himself from a tree branch while playing in the woods. In an attempt to start a new life, Barber and his wife moved into a caravan park near Pamber Heath, but he continued seeing Jones.

=== Move to South Africa ===
In January 1973, Barber told his wife that he was going to find a job in Reading. In reality, he instead drove to Heathfield, where he had arranged to meet with Jones and her young daughter, Denise. They then abandoned the car at a clifftop near Hastings, with Barber writing a fake suicide note in order to give the impression that he had taken his own life.

While authorities were searching for their bodies, Barber, Jones and Denise traveled to Heathrow Airport, from where they flew to Durban in South Africa. The move was supposed to be temporary, as their intended final destination was supposed to be New Zealand, but Barber insisted on staying. The three settled in the nearby suburb of Pinetown, where Barber opened a decorating business called Kitchen Concepts and Jones worked at a supermarket. Their relationship began to deteriorate, however, with the pair frequently having petty arguments.

== Murders ==
In December 1973, Barber returned home and found that somebody had apparently tampered with his personal papers. Thinking this was the work of Jones, he went to her workplace and engaged in a verbal confrontation with her. Later that same night, Jones and Denise went to Barber's factory, where Jones continued arguing with him in an office. In the midst of the argument, Barber grabbed a piece of cord and strangled both of them, then stuffed the bodies in two 44-gallon drums and covered them with sawdust and cement. He then paid one of his workers £1 to dispose of the drums, which the man did – it is suspected they were left at a nearby rubbish dump, but they were never found.

Following the disappearance of the Joneses, Barber continued living in Pinetown, where he befriended some of the local populace. Among them was a local petrol pump attendant named Philippine Ndlovu, with whom he eventually began a romantic relationship. Friends of the pair claimed that they often had violent arguments and frequently broke up, only to reconcile on multiple occasions. One day in 1976, Ndlovu went to visit Barber at his home in Pinetown and disappeared without a trace.

Within weeks of Ndlovu's disappearance, Barber started another relationship with one of his female employees, 25-year-old Cecilia Majola. Similar to his previous affairs, it resulted in multiple break-ups and reconciliations, with Barber always convincing Majola to come back by writing her eloquent love letters. In early 1979, Barber learned that Majola was pregnant with his child. Unwilling to have a mixed-race child, he grabbed an iron bar and hit her on the head, killing her instantly. He then proceeded to mutilate Majola's body in an attempt to make it resemble a muti killing, after which he abandoned the body on a nearby road. Majola's severed ears were burned in a plastic bucket and thrown into a nearby river.

== Arrest and confessions ==
Around March 1979, Barber phoned Lt. Louis du Toit, a friend in the local detachment of the South African Police (SAP), saying that he wanted to buy a wreath and coffin for Majola's funeral. This aroused suspicion in du Toit, who reported the call to his superiors. Barber was immediately designated the prime suspect in Majola's disappearance, and on 5 March he was arrested and charged with her murder. Over the next couple of weeks, he was also charged with the murders of Irene and Denise Jones, as well as Philippine Ndlovu.

While he was awaiting trial, a unit of SAP officers led by Maj. Chris Groenewald was organized in an attempt to locate the missing women's bodies. Despite searching the rubbish dump, the drums in which their bodies were supposedly stuffed were never found.

== Trial and sentence ==
Barber's trial began on September 10, 1979, with Deputy Attorney General of Natal Hendrik Klem serving as prosecutor, while Peter Combrinck handled Barber's defence. Initially, both Barber and Combrinck denied the charges that the Joneses and Ndlovu were deceased, citing the fact that their bodies had not been found and that thus, there was no sufficient evidence to prove they were dead. In regard to the Majola murder, Barber admitted that he had indeed killed her but claimed that it was done in self-defence.

According to his account, Majola went to Barber's factory one night and started a violent argument in which she attempted to stab him with a knife. Barber claimed that he panicked and accidentally killed her, but as he did not want to "shame" himself by telling his friends in the SAP, so he instead decided to make it appear like a ritualistic murder. When confronted with the fact that he did not confess responsibility until presented with irrefutable evidence, Barber admitted that was indeed the case, and that he hoped nothing was wrong with him mentally.

The sensational trial insensed the local population, so much so that extra security had to be hired in order to keep order in court. Throughout the proceedings, Barber regularly took notes, consulted with his lawyers and even joked with some of the court officers, leading to the press coining him the moniker "The Laughing Killer." At one point during the trial, Irene Jones' husband, Reginald, was called in to testify against Barber, claiming that he had attacked by him on at least two occasions in an attempt to make Reginald divorce his wife.

By the end of the trial, all of Barber's claims were dismissed by the court, with Justice Neville James stating that the defendant had killed the women in a "cruel, merciless and evil" fashion. While Barber was acquitted of murdering Ndlovu due to lack of evidence, he was convicted of killing the Joneses and Majola, for which he was promptly sentenced to death on each count.

== Imprisonment and execution ==
Following his conviction, Barber was transferred to the Pretoria Central Prison's death row to await execution. Despite multiple attempts on behalf of the British government to have his sentence commuted, all of his appeals were denied. In an attempt to have his sentence commuted, Barber admitted responsibility for killing Ndlovu, but this was considered insufficient for a reduction.

On December 11, 1980, Barber was hanged at the Pretoria Central Prison. When informed of the execution, Bryan Jones said that his family could now finally rest and that he was satisfied that Barber was dead.

== See also ==
- Capital punishment in South Africa
- List of murder convictions without a body
- List of serial killers in South Africa
