= Tommy Williams (serial killer) =

South African serial killer

- Born: Andries Tommy Williams; 1970 (age 55–56); Kimberley, Northern Cape, South Africa
- Other name: "The City Serial Killer"
- Convictions: Murder x3 Assault x2 Theft x2
- Penalty: Life imprisonment x2 plus 10 years

Details
- Victims: 3
- Span of crimes: 1987–2008
- Country: South Africa
- State: Northern Cape
- Date apprehended: 2008

Andries Tommy Williams (born 1970), known as The City Serial Killer, is a South African serial killer who, between 1987 and 2008, strangled to death three acquaintances, two of them children. Labeled as the country's longest-active serial offender, Williams was found guilty of all three murders in 2009, and sentenced to two life imprisonment terms plus 10 years for his first murder, which was committed while he was still a minor.

== Early life ==
Little is known about Williams' early life. He was born and raised in Vergenoeg, a suburb of Kimberley, the second youngest in a family of six children. Prior to his capture, his only known criminal conviction was for theft in 1990, for which he was lashed seven times.

== Murders ==
In 1987, the 16-year-old Williams decided to accompany 8-year-old Marthatjie 'Martha' Botha, a neighbour of his, to a shop in Galeshewe. After they finished, Williams proceeded to lure her into an unused sports stadium, where he proceeded to strangle her to death. He then covered the girl's body with grass and branches, and went to the police, claiming that he had 'found' her in that state. He was not considered a suspect at the time, and the case went cold.

In 2004, 13-year-old Thabang Bihi disappeared from his home in Warrenton. After searches were conducted, Bihi's decomposed body, again covered with grass and branches, was found at an abandoned house. His cause of death initially couldn't be ascertained due to the state of the corpse, but it was considered homicidal in nature, as a shoelace was found wrapped around his neck. Thabang was friends with Williams, who had also coincidentally lived in that same house, and was found in possession of some of Bihi's personal items. However, it was deemed that the evidence was lacklustre, and he was let go.

The last murder would occur four years later, in Roodepan. Williams was friends with a 28-year-old disabled man named Norman Petrus Watermeyer, who suffered from scoliosis and had a weakened right arm. The two were last seen together before Norman vanished mysteriously. Not long after, the Watermeyers began to receive anonymous phone calls, in which the caller claimed that Norman was alive and well, but had skipped town out of fear, as he had been scheduled for an upcoming operation. Sometime later, his partially burned body was discovered by youths in Roodepan, and this time, Williams was considered the prime suspect, backed up by the fact that he had Watermeyer's cellphone and other possessions with him. Despite these strong implications, again, there was no conclusive evidence for an arrest. Williams would later positively identify the body as that of Watermeyer in the mortuary, before giving away his belongings.

== Arrest, trial, and sentence ==
One of the investigating officers for the Watermeyer homicide was Det. Inspector Fernando Luis, who was aware of Williams' connections to the 2004 Bihi murder. At the time, there were rumours that Williams had found the body of another child murdered decades prior, and Luis was determined to locate the case. He discovered that the child in question was 8-year-old Martha Botha, who was a neighbour of Williams. Drawing connections between the three killings - all vulnerable victims, strangled, and known friends of Williams - Luis dug further, contacting Martha's mother and looking up old archived newspapers to back up his suspicions. After finding all the necessary information, Luis presented it to his superiors, and not long after, Williams was put on trial for all three murders. This feat earned the detective praise from both Senior Superintendent Lindela Mashigo, and Professor Gerard Labuschagne, commanding officer of SAPS' investigative psychology unit and one of the country's most respected researchers on serial murder.

At trial, it was noted by Prof. Labuschagne that if convicted, Williams would be South Africa's longest-active serial offender, spanning 21 years, but fortunately, with only three victims. Utilising the evidence, Justice Steven Majiedt ruled that the accused was guilty beyond any reasonable doubt, as all of the evidence, albeit circumstantial, proved that he was behind the killings of all three victims, and two additional assaults on women. Now dubbed the 'City Serial Killer' by attending media, Williams was handed down two life terms with an additional 10 years, showing no remorse for his actions and inviting journalists for interviews at his cell. Williams later submitted an appeal to the Northern Cape High Court, but it was promptly rejected. His sentences are to be served concurrently, and he remains incarcerated to this day.

== See also ==
- List of serial killers in South Africa
