= Johannes van Rooyen and Dumisani Makhubela =

South African serial killers

- Van Rooyen (left) and Makhubela in 2007
- Born: van Rooyen: 1979 or 1980 (age 45–46); Makhubela: 1978 or 1979 (age 46–47)
- Convictions: Murder (x7); Rape (x6); 8 other crimes
- Penalty: 445 years imprisonment

Details
- Victims: 7
- Span of crimes: May – June 2005
- Country: South Africa
- State: Mpumalanga
- Date apprehended: 7 June 2005 (Makhubela); December 2005 (van Rooyen)

Johannes van Rooyen (born 1979–1980) and Dumisani Makhubela (born 1978–1979) are a pair of South African serial killers, (Note: Although they were active for shorter amount of time than what is typical of serial killers, academic sources refer to them as serial killers rather than spree killers.) rapists, and mass murderers who murdered seven people in Mhluzi over the autumn and winter of 2005. Although most infamous for murdering a family of four, they also killed a woman and a young couple, all in the Mpumalanga province. They were arrested soon after their final two murders and each sentenced to 445 years imprisonment.

== Murders ==
On 23 May 2005, the two invaded the Middelburg house of the Mutebu family because they falsely believed the family had won the lottery. Upon entering the residence, they used wires to bound the hands and feet of Vusi Motebu, 33; his wife, Thuli Mathebula, 30; and their daughters, eight-year-old Nhlanhla and seven-year-old Koketso. The pair then forced the couple and Koketso to watch them take turns raping Nhlanhla on the bed in an attempt to make them give up their nonexistent lottery winnings. They also raped Mathebula. Afterwards, van Rooyen and Makhubela fatally stabbed Nhlanhla in the neck on the bed. On the floor beside her, they strangled her sister to death. In the kitchen, they stabbed the father in his chest and fatally strangled or hanged him. Finally, they hanged Thuli from the rafters of her living room with an electric cable. They then ransacked the home, stealing a hi-fi, DVD player, a handbag, jewellery, and framed photos. The only survivor of the attack was the parents' toddler-age son, who was asleep at the time of the murders. He spent four days in the house before a neighbour discovered the boy and the bodies of the victims.

On 28 May 2005, the pair fatally strangled Nomakhosi Msombuka, a 21-year-old woman who was alone at her boyfriend's house.

While walking in a veld on 4 June 2005, the two happened upon 15-year-old Portia Motau and her boyfriend, 16-year-old Hlopi Mahlangu. They proceeded to rape Motau before bludgeoning them both to death with rocks. They then stole both victims' clothing and fled the scene. The victims' bodies were found shortly afterwards, and the two perpetrators were linked to the murders by fingerprints and DNA. Makhubela was arrested hours after the discovery along with two others, who were later proven innocent. Van Rooyen remained at large until December 2005, when police tracked him down to a brick factory in Ogies, where he was employed as a labourer. They were connected to the murders of Msombuka and the Mutebu family after the victims' clothes were found in their possession.

=== Summary ===
Name	Age	Sex	Date	Cause of death
Nhlanhla Mutebu	8	F	23 May 2005	Stabbed in the neck
Thuli Mathebula (Note: Also known as Nokuthula Florence)	30	F	23 May 2005	Hanged
Vusi Motebu	33	M	23 May 2005	Stabbed in the chest and strangled or hanged
Koketso Mutebu	7	F	23 May 2005	Strangled
Nomakhosi Masombuka	21	F	28 May 2005	Strangled
Portia Motau	15	F	4 June 2005	Stoned
Hlopi Mahlangu	16	M	4 June 2005	Stoned

== Arrest, conviction, and sentencing ==
Van Rooyen and Makhubela were charged with 24 crimes, including seven counts of murder, six counts of rape, robbery with aggravating circumstances, housebreaking, and possession of an unlicensed firearm. Both pleaded not guilty to all charges. On 24 January 2006, forensic psychologist Gérard Labuschagne interviewed van Rooyen and Makhubela. Although both confessed to the murders, they tried to depict the other as the dominant partner. Labuschagne quickly concluded that van Rooyen was the "leader" of the two.

At their two-year-long trial, they were found guilty of 21 charges on 2 October 2007 but acquitted on two counts of raping a minor and one count of possession of unlicensed ammunition. Both were sentenced to 445 years imprisonment.

== Wrongful arrests ==
Makhubela was initially arrested along with two other men. One of the men was allegedly forced to confess under torture, and the other under duress. This led to the men being charged with the murders and being held in prison without bail for nine months. However, they were released on 10 February 2006 after the director of public prosecutions refused to prosecute the pair.

In April 2019, the police minister was ordered to pay the two a combined R340,000 after a lawsuit. One received R190,000, and R150,000 went to the other man's estate, as he had died before the lawsuit was filed. The men were only awarded damages for two weeks' detention, as the Supreme Court of Appeals ruled that the police were not liable for damages post the bail stage.

== See also ==
- List of serial killers in South Africa
