= Cape Town Prostitute Killer =

South African serial killer

- Other name: "The Cape Town Strangler"
- Status: Unidentified
- Reward amount: R500,000

Details
- Victims: 19
- Span of crimes: 1992–1996
- Country: South Africa
- State: Western Cape
- Targets: Prostitutes; Domestic workers
- Weapon: Garrote
- Date apprehended: N/A

The Cape Town Prostitute Killer, also known as The Cape Town Strangler, is an unidentified South African serial killer who fatally strangled 16 prostitutes and three domestic workers in Cape Town between 1992 and 1996. His modus operandi consisted of picking up his victims on rainy nights, fatally strangling them in his car, and dumping their bodies in preselected locations. Although none of the victims were raped, the perpetrator often tried to stage them to make it look as if they were.

One suspect was arrested in connection to one of the murders but released a year later due to a lack of evidence, and it was later proven that some of the evidence against him was false.

== Murders ==
Between 1992 and 1996, the killer strangled 16 prostitutes and three domestic workers to death in Cape Town. In the evening, he would pick up a victim in his vehicle along the Voortrekker strip and park his car in a parking lot. There, he would order his victim to take her clothes off and then hit her in the face. Every victim had injuries on their jaws. Afterwards, he would force the victim onto his lap and strangle her to death. He then drove to a preselected spot to dump the body. The rain would wash away the killer's tyre tracks and other forensic evidence.

The perpetrator staged crime scenes in an attempt to stop investigators from linking them to one offender. In some cases, he shallowly buried his victims. Other times, he posed the victims in a sexual manner to make it look as if they had been raped. However, no semen was found and there were no signs of forced penetration on any victim, perhaps suggesting the perpetrator was sexually dysfunctional. Additionally, the killer left each victim in a separate area from the last. However, he eventually ran out of new locations to dump the corpses after his eleventh murder, leading to the crimes getting linked.

After the killings were linked, prostitutes gave police their fingerprints and had their photographs taken so that they could be easily identified if they were murdered. Law enforcement personnel also issued posters around the area with emergency phone numbers. As a further precaution, pimps and prostitutes wrote down the registration numbers of every vehicle that picked them up. Nevertheless, seven more victims were murdered, one of whom was 39-year-old Gloria Samuels. Samuels' corpse was found heavily decomposed with a coke bottle inside of her vagina.

The final victim was Theresa van der Vint, a 16-year-old prostitute. On 15 May 1996, she was looking for clients on a tree-lined part of Old Faure Road near the Eerste River. Most prostitutes alongside her were older and went home to care for their children, but van der Vint decided to stay out longer. At dusk, the perpetrator picked her up in his car. A few hours later, her body was discovered half-naked in the sand, concealed with branches, off a footpath near Macassar beach. Her skirt had been pulled up and her legs were spread apart. Her jacket was also wrapped around her face and neck. Her cause of death was strangulation, presumably with a ligature. She was the 19th and youngest victim.

== Suspect ==
One prostitute told a sergeant that one of her clients had a fantasy about putting Coke bottles into women's genitals. He was an unemployed elderly man who lived in a caravan just off Voortrekker Road. The man had difficulty getting erect and frequently socialised with prostitutes. He also drove a blue and white bakkie, which matched the description of a vehicle that had been seen close to where Samuels' body was found. His ex-wife stated that he often disappeared for hours at a time without explaining his whereabouts. The man claimed that he had blackouts and suffered from amnesia. However, when he went to a hospital the day after Samuels' murder, doctors determined he suffered no symptoms of memory loss.

Detectives brought the man into questioning in April 1996. During the interview, the suspect stated that although he could have killed the woman, he had no memory of it. He was released and remained free until 21 June 1996. That day, he called the local police control room and threatened that once his bakkie was in working order again, more women would be killed. The call was recorded and the voice matched the suspect. He was subsequently arrested and taken to the Pollsmoor Penitentiary. While imprisoned, he befriended Norman Afzal Simons, a murderer known as "The Station Strangler." A search of the suspect's bakkie revealed fingerprints of Katrina Seliston, the strangler's sixteenth victim. He was charged with that murder, but released from prison in September 1997 due to a lack of evidence. Years later, a police officer was exposed for planting Seliston's fingerprints on the suspect's vehicle.

== Victims ==
#	Name	Age	Date of murder	Body found
1	Christene Fieltyn	22	28 October 1992	Atlantis
2	Elizabeth Martincich	29	12 March 1993	Worcester
3	Sarah Meintjies	29	13 March 1993	Philadelphia
4	Francina Manuel	30	31 March 1993	Durbanville
5	Unknown	?	8 July 1993	Kraaifontein
6	Nolundi Mbukwana	23	8 September 1993	Gordons Bay
7	Elmarie Engelbrecht	22	1 March 1994	Worcester
8	Susan Opperman	34	12 June 1994	Gordons Bay
9	Margaret Phillips	23	8 July 1994	Somerset West
10	Bridgette Lindt	28	10 August 1994	Milnerton
11	Shireen Jooste	38	9 September 1995	Philadelphia
12	Marilyn Persent	30	15 September 1995	Milnerton
13	Patricia Gibson	35	20 September 1995	Camps Bay
14	Shahieda Abrahams	31	13 October 1995	Durbanville
15	Gloria Samuels	39	3 January 1996	Durbanville
16	Francis Seliston	?	24 March 1996	Brackenfell
17	Katrina Fredericks	?	7 April 1996	Brackenfell
18	Elizabeth Thompson	?	14 April 1996	Brackenfell
19	Theresa van der Vint	16	15 May 1996	Macassar
Ref:

== See also ==
- List of serial killers in South Africa
