= Samuel Sidyno =

South African serial killer (born 1962)

- Born: Samuel Sidyno; 1962 (age 63–64); South Africa
- Other name: Capital Park Serial Killer
- Penalty: 7 life sentences, effectively 40 years

Details
- Victims: 7
- Span of crimes: 1998–1999
- Country: South Africa
- Date apprehended: 6 January 1999

Samuel Sidyno (born 1962) is a South African serial killer who was convicted in 2000 of seven murders and sentenced to seven life sentences in prison. His victims all came from the Pretoria area of Gauteng.

Sidyno undertook a murderous rampage starting in November 1998 and culminating with his arrest on 6 January 1999. He killed and disposed of his victims in the Capital Park hills of Pretoria, a deserted area of hills near the city centre and Pretoria Zoo.

== Victims ==
His victims included two adult women; Paulinah Ledwaba and Elizabeth Senwamadi. He also killed five youths, only two of whom could be identified; Ronald Maoka and Emmanuel Mavuka. Sidyno assaulted and strangled his victims before re-clothing them and covering their bodies with brush. He was noted for removing his victim's shoes and placing them neatly next to their bodies.

== Convictions ==
On 30 August 2000, Sidyno was convicted of the seven murders. He was sentenced by Judge Johan van der Westhuizen on 5 September 2000 to seven life terms with a recommended 40 years in jail before he could be paroled. The judge said an expert on serial killers had described Sidyno as a psychopathic, sadistic sexual murderer, adding that Sidyno could therefore not be rehabilitated.

== See also ==
- List of serial killers in South Africa
