= Fosaville serial killer =

Unidentified South African serial killer

- Other names: Newlands serial killer Durban's Killing Fields
- Years active: 1999–2003

Details
- Victims: 13
- Country: South Africa
- Date apprehended: N/A

The Fosaville serial killer is an unidentified serial killer who murdered 13 women between 1999 and 2003 in Newlands West, an area near Durban, South Africa.

== Murders ==
In March 2002, the skeletal remains of a woman were found in a secluded area in Newlands West, an area near the city of Durban, South Africa. No more victims were discovered until 2003, when locals burnt an overgrown field to make room for housing.

In August 2003, police found the body of a woman aged 20 to 30. Police searched the area for evidence and discovered four more bodies. Three of the victims were skeletonised. The other victim was partially decomposed. All of the women were half-dressed, face down, and had a plastic bag on their heads. Their hands were also bound behind their backs. Two days later, two more bodies were found by police nearby.

Two weeks later, on 23 August 2003, people stumbled upon the body of another woman not far from where the previous six were found. On the following day, police discovered the remains of three more women. One of the victims was in an advanced stage of decomposition. A few days later, on August 27, 2003, the authorities found another victim while conducting a K9 search of the area.

The victims were found in Fosaville, an area just outside of Durban in Newlands West.

All of the victims were strangled to death, half-dressed, and had their hands bound behind their backs. It's believed that the victims were murdered where they were discovered as opposed to being dumped there postmortem.

== Investigation ==
The perpetrator is believed to be intelligent, charismatic, and appears trustworthy to his victims. Some have theorised that he lures his victims to secluded places by promising them employment.

Due to the victims being heavily decomposed, they could not be identified. Locals informed the authorities of missing relatives, but it was futile. In 2006, a composite sketch was made of each victim, but that also didn't help to identify the women.

There is a possibility that the serial killer could be "Riverman", another unidentified serial killer who murdered 13 women in the Greenwood Park area from 1999 to 2001. Others think the perpetrator died. However, it would be difficult to identify the serial killer because the investigators never recovered his DNA.

== See also ==
- List of serial killers in South Africa
