= Jimmy Maketta =

South African rapist and serial killer (born 1964)

- Born: Jimmy Maketta; 1964/5; South Africa
- Convictions: Murder (x16); Rape (x19)

Details
- Span of crimes: April – December 2005
- Country: South Africa
- State: Cape Town

Jimmy Maketta (born 1964/65) is a South African rapist and serial killer who in 2007 pleaded guilty and was convicted on 16 counts of murder and 19 counts of rape. A state psychiatrist described him as a psychopath.

Maketta described how, from April to December 2005, he would attack farm labourers from a hill on Friday evenings near the township of Philippi, Cape Town.

== See also ==
- List of serial killers in South Africa
- List of serial killers by number of victims
