= Stander (surname) =

Stander, or Ständer, is a surname. Notable people with the surname include:

- Andre Stander (1946–1984), South African police officer and bank robber
- Brynard Stander (born 1990), South African rugby union player
- Burry Stander (1987–2013), South African cyclist
- CJ Stander (born 1990), South African rugby union player
- Hatto Ständer (1929–2000), German church musician, academic and composer
- Jan Stander (born 1982), Scottish cricketer
- Lionel Stander (1908–1994), American actor
- Riaan Stander (born 1972), South African serial killer
- Ron Stander (1944–2022), American boxer and referee
- Phillipus Petrus Stander Missionary Dingaanstad KZN 1940s to 1970s, close friend of Mr Mangosuthu Buthelezi
