= Sibusiso Duma =

South African serial killer

- Born: Sibusiso Derrick Duma; 6 May 1984 (age 42); South Africa
- Penalty: 8 life sentences + 139 years

Details
- Victims: 7
- Span of crimes: 9 September – 25 October 2007
- Country: South Africa
- State: KwaZulu Natal
- Date apprehended: 2007

Sibusiso Derrick Duma (born 6 May 1984) is a South African serial killer who was convicted of two murders in 2007 and five murders in 2009 and sentenced to 8 life sentences in prison. He was mostly active around the City of Pietermaritzburg, KwaZulu Natal.

Duma partook in theft, kidnapping, torture, rape and murder. He worked as a taxi driver and used his vehicle as a weapon on occasion, as well as to obtain his victims. Duma's reasoning, victimology and methodology changed sometimes from victim to victim, indicating that he was a disorganised killer.

== Murders ==
Duma conducted his first kill on 9 September 2007 when he used his minibus taxi to run over and kill a Department of Education security guard, Mqeku Zondi. Duma had been hired to drive Mr. Zondi to his residence for an agreed-upon fee. The conductor of Duma's taxi, Mlungisi Bhengu, testified that Zondi reneged on paying the fare for some of the journey, at which point "Duma drove into the old man, ran over him with the wheels of the taxi and then reversed over his body again". Duma then robbed the victim of his remaining money and a 9mm Norinco pistol.

On the evening of 14 October 2007, Duma and his accomplice, Simphiwe Khesi, had been drinking at a local shebeen. Leaving a little after 19:00, the men realised that there would be no taxis available, so they planned to hijack a vehicle in order to get home. Finding a suitable vehicle, Duma shot and killed the driver, First National Bank employee Patricia Kippen (39). The shooting brought attention from nearby residents, causing the duo to abandon the vehicle. They soon found another possible target vehicle, shooting and killing the driver, former Witness crime journalist Elaine Anderson (59).

On 19 October 2007, Duma raped, shot and murdered Hlengiwe Shangase. Duma had waited near her home before dragging her to a desolate area and raping her. He then shot her in the head at point-blank range using the Norinco pistol he had stolen from Mqeku Zondi.

The following day, Duma hijacked, shot and killed two men: Masizane Mtshatsha and Thamsanqua Mbindwane. An hour later, now driving in the hijacked VW Polo, Duma kidnapped three further victims: Tsepo Mhlongo, Linda Jali and a teenage girl. The two men were robbed, ordered out of the vehicle, shot and left for dead. Duma and his accomplice, Simphiwe Khesi, took the young girl to Azalea Cemetery where they raped her. Duma then drove the stolen car over the girl multiple times in order to kill her.

Finally, on 25 October 2007, Duma kidnapped, robbed, raped and murdered Pinetown teacher, Noxolo Dlamini.

== Conviction and charges ==
Duma was originally charged, convicted and sentenced along with Simphiwe Khesi for the murders of Kippen and Anderson on 14 November 2007. Judge President Vuka Tshabalala sentenced the men to 15 years each for attempting to rob Anderson and sentenced Duma to 15 years for robbing Kippen and Khesi 20 years, in addition to the life sentences for murder. Both men laughed when sentenced, saying, "They're dead now. What are they worrying about?"

On 4 August 2009, Duma was further charged in connection with his various other crimes. On 17 August 2009, Acting Judge Kobus Booyens imposed a further six life sentences and prison terms totalling 104 years. He said he intends that Duma should be permanently removed from society.

== See also ==
- List of serial killers in South Africa
