= Norman Afzal Simons =

South African serial killer

- Born: Cape Town, South Africa
- Other name: Station Strangler
- Occupation: Teacher
- Status: paroled; released November 2023
- Penalty: 35 years imprisonment (25 years for murder, 10 years for kidnap)

Details
- Victims: Unknown; 1 conviction
- Span of crimes: 1986–1994
- Country: South Africa
- State: Western Cape
- Date apprehended: 1994
- Imprisoned at: Drakenstein Correctional Centre

Norman Afzal Simons, known as the Station Strangler, is a South African murderer, rapist and suspected serial killer in Cape Town in the late 20th century. He was convicted in 1995 of the rape and murder of 10-year-old Elroy van Rooyen in 1995 and sentenced to 35 years in prison. He became eligible for parole in July 2023 and was released on parole and under 24-hour monitoring in November 2023.

== Early life and career ==
Norman Simons was born in Cape Town, South Africa.

He was assessed as an intelligent individual, who enjoyed playing classical music and spoke seven languages, including English, Afrikaans, Xhosa and French. He was employed as a Grade Five teacher at Alpine Primary School in Beacon Valley, Mitchell's Plain.

== Murders ==
Simons is believed to have started his sporadic series of murders on 29 October 1986, ending only with his arrest nine years later in April 1994. He collected his moniker after it became apparent that most of his victims were lured away from train stations (Soviet serial killer Andrei Chikatilo had a similar modus operandi).

Simons raped and sodomised his victims before strangling them. Victims were found face down with their hands tied behind their backs, buried in shallow sandy graves. In some cases, the victims were found with their underwear around their necks, presumably used as a garrote. Hand-written notes were also found next to some victims.

Simons' alleged victims were all young boys aged between 9 and 13. Many of them were from the Khoekhoe community. Alleged victims included Elino Sprinkle (11), Donovan Swarts (11), Neville Samaai (13), Jeremy Benjamin (10), Owen Hoofmeester (12), Fabian Willmore (8), Marcelino Cupido (10), and five unidentified victims aged between 10 and 14.

== Investigation ==
Forensic psychologist and criminal profiler Micki Pistorius was brought in to assist in the investigation in 1994, and was able to point to Simons as the killer.

== Trial, sentencing, and imprisonment ==
Simons appeared before magistrates in 1995 on one charge of murder and kidnap. His trial lasted three months, leading to a conviction and life sentence. He was sentenced to 35 years (25 for murder and 10 for kidnapping) in prison.

He served 28 years of his sentence in Drakenstein Maximum Correctional Facility, Paarl. Simons appealed against his conviction in 1998, but his conviction was upheld.

Simons converted to Islam in 1993, taking on the name Afzal, but converted back to Christianity in 1994.

== 2005 inquest ==
In 2005, an inquest was opened into the deaths of the remaining victims. After three years of further analysis, the victims' parents came no closer to an answer. On 9 December 2008, Regional Magistrate Marelize Rolle stated that she believed prima facie evidence showed Simons was probably responsible for the deaths of at least six of the other victims. However, due to the amount of time that had passed, she ruled out further prosecutions in the case.

== Release ==
Simons was granted parole in July 2023 and was released in November 2023, to the dismay of the Parow community. However, the Parow Community Police Forum chair, who was part of regular meetings before Simon's release, said that he had behaved well and was adhering to his parole conditions. He is under house arrest, and is being monitored by a caregiver 24/7 and being treated for a medical condition. He also has regular meetings with the Department of Correctional Services.

== In popular culture ==
The investigation is featured in the 2024 TV series about Micki Pistorius, called Catch Me a Killer.

== See also ==
- List of serial killers by country
- List of serial killers by number of victims
- List of serial killers in South Africa
