= List of syphilis cases =

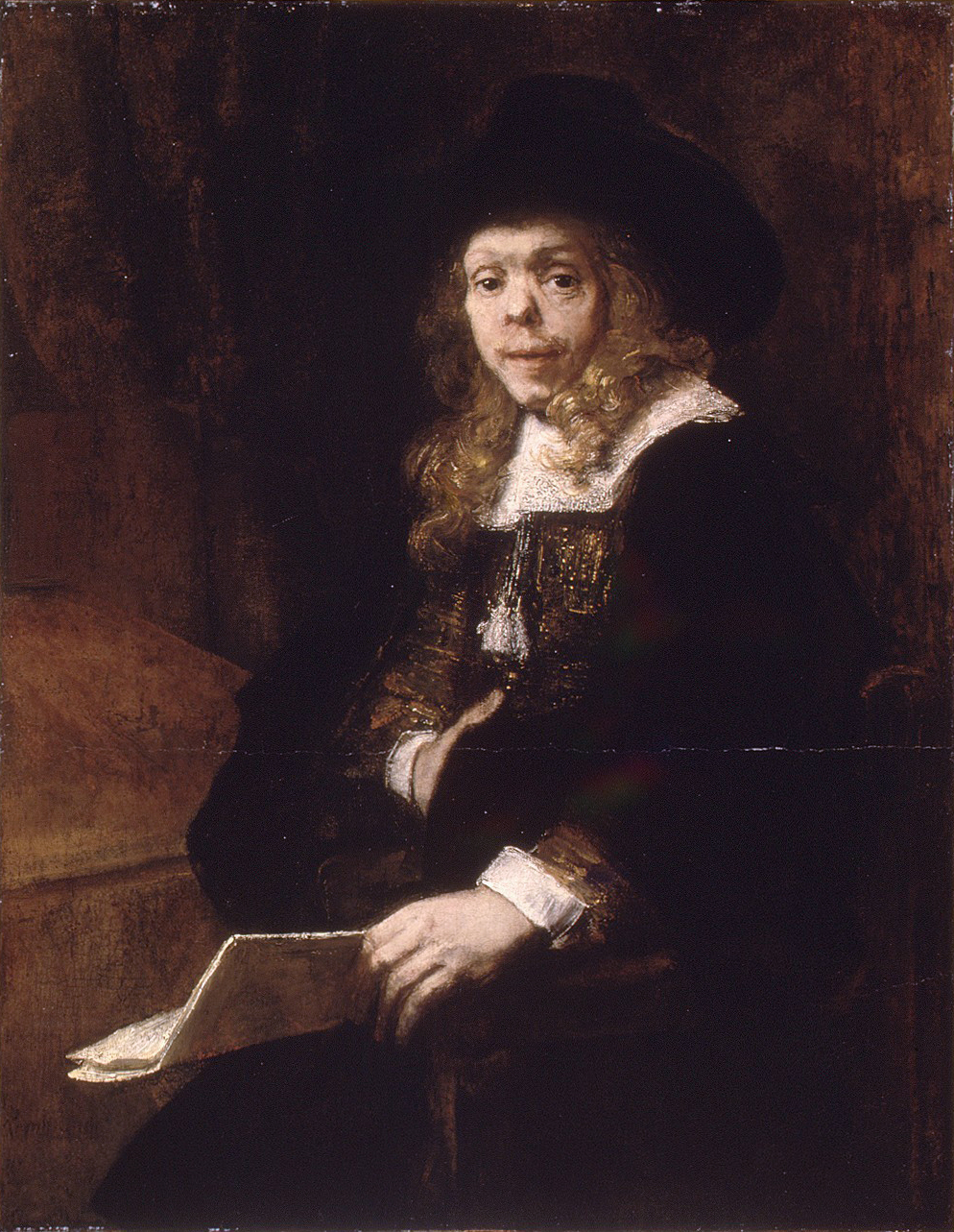
Portrait of Gerard de Lairesse by Rembrandt van Rijn, c. 1665–67, oil on canvas. De Lairesse, himself a painter and art theorist, suffered from congenital syphilis that severely deformed his face and eventually blinded him.

This is a list of famous historical figures diagnosed with or strongly suspected as having had syphilis at some time. Many people who acquired syphilis were treated and recovered; some died from it.

Many famous historical figures, including Charles VIII of France, Christopher Columbus, Hernán Cortés of Spain, Benito Mussolini, and Ivan the Terrible, were often alleged to have had syphilis or other sexually transmitted infections. Sometimes these allegations were false and formed part of a political whispering campaign. In other instances, retrospective diagnoses of suspected cases have been made in modern times. Mental illness caused by late-stage syphilis was once a common form of dementia. This was known as the general paresis of the insane.

Name	Details
Cesare Borgia (1475–1507), Italian Cardinal	Strongly suspected of having syphilis
Gerard de Lairesse (1641–1711), Dutch painter and art theorist	Congenital syphilis
Edward Teach (1680–1718), West Indian pirate	Better known as Blackbeard. Died in battle against Robert Maynard
Friedrich Wilhelm von Seydlitz (1721–1773), Prussian cavalry lieutenant general	Died from syphilis
Gaetano Donizetti (1797–1848), Italian opera composer	Neurosyphilis
Charles Baudelaire (1821–1867), French poet	
Lola Montez (1821–1861), Irish dancer, courtesan, mistress of Ludwig I	Died from syphilis
Leland Stanford (1824–1893), American politician & robber baron	Retrospectively diagnosed or suspected to have died of syphilis.
Camilo Castelo Branco (1825–1890), Portuguese writer	Died by suicide on account of blindness caused by neurosyphilis.
Leo Tolstoy (1828–1910), Russian writer	Suspected to have had syphilis
Alphonse Daudet (1840–1897), French novelist	
Friedrich Nietzsche (1844–1900), German philosopher	Cause of death disputed, but syphilis or mercury poisoning from syphilis treatment are leading theories.
Franz Schubert (1797–1828), Austrian composer	Cause of death disputed, but symptoms match to mercury poisoning from syphilis treatment.
Robert Schumann (1810–1856), German composer	Acquired syphilis from a prostitute at the age of 21.
Bram Stoker (1847–1912), Irish author	Cause of death listed as "Locomotor ataxia 6 months", presumed to be a reference to syphilis.
Guy de Maupassant (1850–1893), French writer	
Mikhail Vrubel (1856–1910), Russian painter	
Frederick Delius (1862–1934), English music composer	Died from syphilis
Henri de Toulouse-Lautrec (1864–1901), French painter	
Eugen Sandow (1867–1925), German bodybuilder	Suspected to have had syphilis
Vladimir Lenin (1870–1924), Soviet politician	Retrospectively diagnosed or suspected to have died of syphilis.
Karen Blixen (1885–1962), Danish writer	
Adolf Hitler (1889–1945), German dictator	Suspected to have had syphilis
Al Capone (1899–1947), American gangster	Died from syphilis
Lavrentiy Beria (1899–1953), Soviet politician & serial rapist	Admitted before his execution he had been treated for syphilis.
Alger "Texas" Alexander (1900–1954), American blues singer	Died from syphilis
Howard Hughes (1905–1976), American aerospace engineer, business magnate, film producer, investor, philanthropist and pilot.	Diagnosed with neurosyphilis in 1932.
Idi Amin (1928–2003), Ugandan dictator	
