= Riaan Stander =

South African serial killer

- Born: 1972 (age 53–54)
- Status: Incarcerated
- Convictions: Culpable homicide Murder (x2)
- Penalty: 2 Life sentences

Details
- Victims: 3
- Span of crimes: 2001–2007
- Country: South Africa
- States: Gauteng; Eastern Cape
- Date apprehended: 13 September 2007

Riaan Stander (born 1972) is a South African serial killer who murdered two prostitutes in Port Elizabeth (present-day Gqeberha) in August 2007. His modus operandi consisted of picking up prostitutes in the evening, taking them back to his flatlet, slitting their throats with a bread knife, and dumping their bodies nearby. He was apprehended shortly after his final murder and sentenced to life imprisonment at his trial the following year. He had previously been convicted of culpable homicide after he fatally struck a woman with his vehicle in 2001.

== Early life ==
Riaan Stander was born in 1972. Soon after their births, he and his sister were given up for adoption by his mother, a suspected prostitute. He never knew who his father was and, by the time he figured out who his mother was, she had died in a vehicle accident. Stander was adopted by a family who owned a farm in Carletonville. He worked as a truck driver for them until 2001, when he became a manager for a local garage and Kwik Shop. Sometime later, he worked as a security guard and until early 2007, as a bus driver for SA Roadlink. He moved to Port Elizabeth around March 2006. At the time of his arrest, he was employed as a long-distance truck driver.

Although his friends described him as a nice person who treated his girlfriend well, Stander held grudges against many people, including his mother, former girlfriends, and employers who he felt had treated him poorly. He had also been convicted of culpable homicide after he fatally struck a woman with his vehicle in 2001. Additionally, he was previously released for an assault charge.

== Murders ==
On the night of 24 August 2007, Stander picked up Lee-Ann Rondganger, a 28-year-old prostitute, in the Port Elizabeth CBD. After driving her to his flatlet, he slit her throat from ear to ear in his bathroom with a bread knife, killing her. He then put a black bin bag over her head and put her body in the back of his bakkie. After driving 432 metres down Carnoustie Road, he stopped his vehicle, retrieved Rondganger's body, and rolled it down into an embankment. The following morning, three churchgoers discovered her corpse while picking lilies and immediately alerted the police. Investigators searched the area for clues and subsequently took her body to a mortuary, where it was identified through a bank card found in her right sock. Detectives then questioned prostitutes where she used to work. From this, they found a lead: the perpetrator drove a bakkie with a Gauteng registration number.

Seven days later, workers painting a house on 30 Carnoustie Road smelled an odour coming from the back of the garden on the property. Curious, they went to investigate and found the decomposing body of a woman wearing only a G-string. The victim had tattoos of red flowers and yellow butterflies along her upper back. Her body had been concealed by branches and, like the previous victim, she died from her throat being slit. After Stander was arrested, she was eventually identified as 23-year-old Noxolo Ngqoyiya. Ngqoyiya worked on the same street in the Port Elizabeth CBD as Rondganger, and was last seen alive on 15 August 2007.

== Arrest and prosecution ==
Detectives interviewed every occupant in the property's main building about the murders and determined that all of them were innocent. However, some occupants told them about Stander, who lived in the flatlet on the premises. A policeman subsequently went to Stander's workplace and asked to speak with him about a murder that occurred near his property. Stander obliged and drove to the police station, where he was interviewed for hours. Throughout the interview, Stander appeared calm, and he never asked about which murder the interrogators were referring to. When interrogators asked him if he knew why he was there, Stander replied, "Something about a murder. But we are talking now so nicely about the old days, why do you want to speak about a murder?"

On 13 September 2007, he was arrested for two counts of murder. Afterwards, he told officers that he was willing to confess and do a pointing-out. However, as he waited for a police official to oversee the pointing-out, his attorney arrived and refused to let him participate in the pointing-out. Meanwhile, forensic teams went to Stander's residence to collect evidence. They started by spraying the luminol-like chemical Blue Star inside the flatlet, leading to the discovery of blood traces in his bathroom. They also sprayed Blue Star on his bakkie, revealing more blood. In the kitchen, they found blood inside a bread knife — the murder weapon. Additionally, a body fluid detection K-9 was sent to the scene, and he identified blood traces on more items in the flatlet.

At his first court appearance, Stander was granted bail of R10,000 but was not allowed to stay at his residence. Consequently, he stayed at his adoptive parents' farm while waiting for his trial to begin. His trial began in February 2009 in the Eastern Cape High Court in Port Elizabeth. The calm Stander pleaded not guilty to the two murder charges, at times laughing. At one point, he fell asleep while pathologists presented evidence about the murders.

Evidence against Stander was mainly related to Rondganger's killing, as all of the blood droplets found at his residence belonged to her. Moreover, the bin bag wrapped around Rondganger's head was linked to a bin bag in Stander's dustbin through extrusion marks. Extrusion lines are created during the manufacturing process and can link one bag to a specific package of plastic bags. The extrusion marks on the bag at the crime scene were an exact match to the bag in his dustbin. Despite having no evidence to directly link Stander to Ngqoyiya's killing, the prosecutor used linkage analysis to explain why both murders had to have been committed by the same offender.

On 19 May 2009, Stander suddenly decided to confess to making admissions regarding the crimes. While sobbing, he confessed that he picked up both victims for sex and murdered them by cutting their throats with a bread knife. He also stated that he was aware of his actions at the time and that the blood traces on the knife were from Lee-Ann Rondganger. He then called his adoptive mother and told her he committed the murders as he wiped tears from his face. Despite this, he still did not change his plea to guilty. Nevertheless, he was found guilty of both murders and given two life sentences by the judge, who called his actions inhumane, barbaric, and premeditated. The judge added, "He is a danger to society and must be removed." As his sentence was being read, Stander looked toward the front of the courtroom without displaying any emotion.

== See also ==
- List of serial killers in South Africa
- Violence against prostitutes
- Recidivism
