= Kalafong Hospital =

Kalafong Provincial Tertiary Hospital
- Gauteng Department of Health

Geography
- Location: Atteridgeville, Pretoria, Gauteng, South Africa
- Coordinates: 25°45′49″S 28°05′25″E

Organisation
- Care system: Public
- Type: Community; teaching
- Affiliated university: University of Pretoria

Services
- Emergency department: Yes
- Beds: 1,113

History
- Founded: March 1, 1972; 54 years ago

Links
- Website: www.kalafonghospital.org.za

Kalafong Provincial Tertiary Hospital (also known as Kalafong Hospital) is a public hospital in Pretoria, Gauteng, South Africa. The hospital is situated on the western outskirts of Pretoria in the suburb of Atteridgeville. The University of Pretoria uses the hospital as a training institution for the Faculty of Health Sciences.

== History ==
Construction commenced in 1965, with patient treatment commencing on 1 March 1972. On 9 March 1973 the Honourable Mr Sybrand van Niekerk, then Administrator of the Transvaal, officially opened the hospital.

== Coat of arms ==
The hospital registered a coat of arms at the Bureau of Heraldry in 1980: Azure, an Ansate cross Argent, charged on the shaft with a bee, Or.
