= Fanuel Makamu =

South African serial killer and serial rapist

- Born: 1977 (age 48–49); Acornhoek, Mpumalanga, South Africa
- Other name: "Mpumalanga Serial Rapist"
- Conviction: Murder
- Penalty: 165 years' imprisonment

Details
- Victims: 6
- Span of crimes: February – September 2000
- Country: South Africa
- State: Mpumalanga
- Date apprehended: September 14, 2000

Fanuel Makamu (born 1977), known as The Mpumalanga Serial Rapist, is a South African robber, rapist and serial killer. Along with his accomplice, Henry Maile, the duo robbed, raped and killed women and nearby witnesses on streets between February and September 2000. Maile was killed during apprehension, and Makamu was sentenced to 165 years' imprisonment.

== Murders ==
Makamu and Maile started their crime spree in February 2000. They would rob and rape women on streets, and at times, shoot anybody accompanying their victims. On one such instance, on August 5, the criminals broke into a water pump station in Cottondale, where a security guard and his girlfriend were sleeping, shooting the man dead and raping the woman, killing her afterwards as well.

In another case, a woman was walking towards her husband's work when the two men forced her to come with them, raping her at Magwagwaza High School in Mhala on May 11.

One of the surviving victims testified about her encounter with the two men: she and a female friend were raped in Mhala on September 2, and overheard their attackers discussing how to kill them. However, Makamu and Maile simply took a cell phone and the women's clothes, and fled.

== Capture and sentence ==
Eventually, while trying to evade arrest, Maile was killed by police raiding his house on September 14. Makamu tried to flee, but was soon turned in by his mother after an outcry from the community.

He was charged with 10 counts of rape, 6 counts of murder, 5 counts of armed robbery, 2 counts of attempted murder, 3 counts of housebreaking, one of attempted robbery, one of attempted housebreaking, 2 of illegal possession of firearms, 2 of illegal possession of ammunition, one of malicious damage to property and one of attempt to escape from custody. Makamu pled not guilty in front of the Circuit Court in Nelspruit; however, Judge Willy Serete found him guilty of 32 charges, acquitting him of 2 rape and robbery charges.

Makamu was given 8 life sentences and 165 years of imprisonment, much to the relief of the community and his mother, Joyce Makhubela. She said that her son got what he deserved for doing such horrible crimes, and upon leaving court with her 19-year-old daughter, Sibongile, both were treated warmly by her son's victims and their families. The mayor of Bushbuckridge, Milton Morema, also expressed his relief with the sentence.

== See also ==
- List of serial killers in South Africa
