= Kensington, Cape Town =

Kensington Windermere
- Location within Western Cape Location within South Africa
- Coordinates: 33°54′37″S 18°30′28″E
- Country: South Africa
- Province: Western Cape
- Municipality: City of Cape Town
- Main Place: Maitland, Cape Town

Area
  - Total: 1.88 km^{2} (0.73 sq mi)

Population (2011)
  - Total: 12,551
  - Density: 6,680/km^{2} (17,300/sq mi)

Racial makeup (2011)
  - Black African: 6.5%
  - Coloured: 88.0%
  - Indian/Asian: 2.6%
  - White: 0.3%
  - Other: 2.6%

First languages (2011)
  - English: 77.4%
  - Afrikaans: 18.4%
  - Other: 6.2%
- Time zone: UTC+2 (SAST)
- Postal code (street): 7405
- PO box: 7405
- Area code: 021

Kensington is one of the northern suburbs of Cape Town.

== Notable people ==
- Lorna de Smidt (1943-2022) - activist
