= Weskoppies Psychiatric Hospital =

- Department of Health
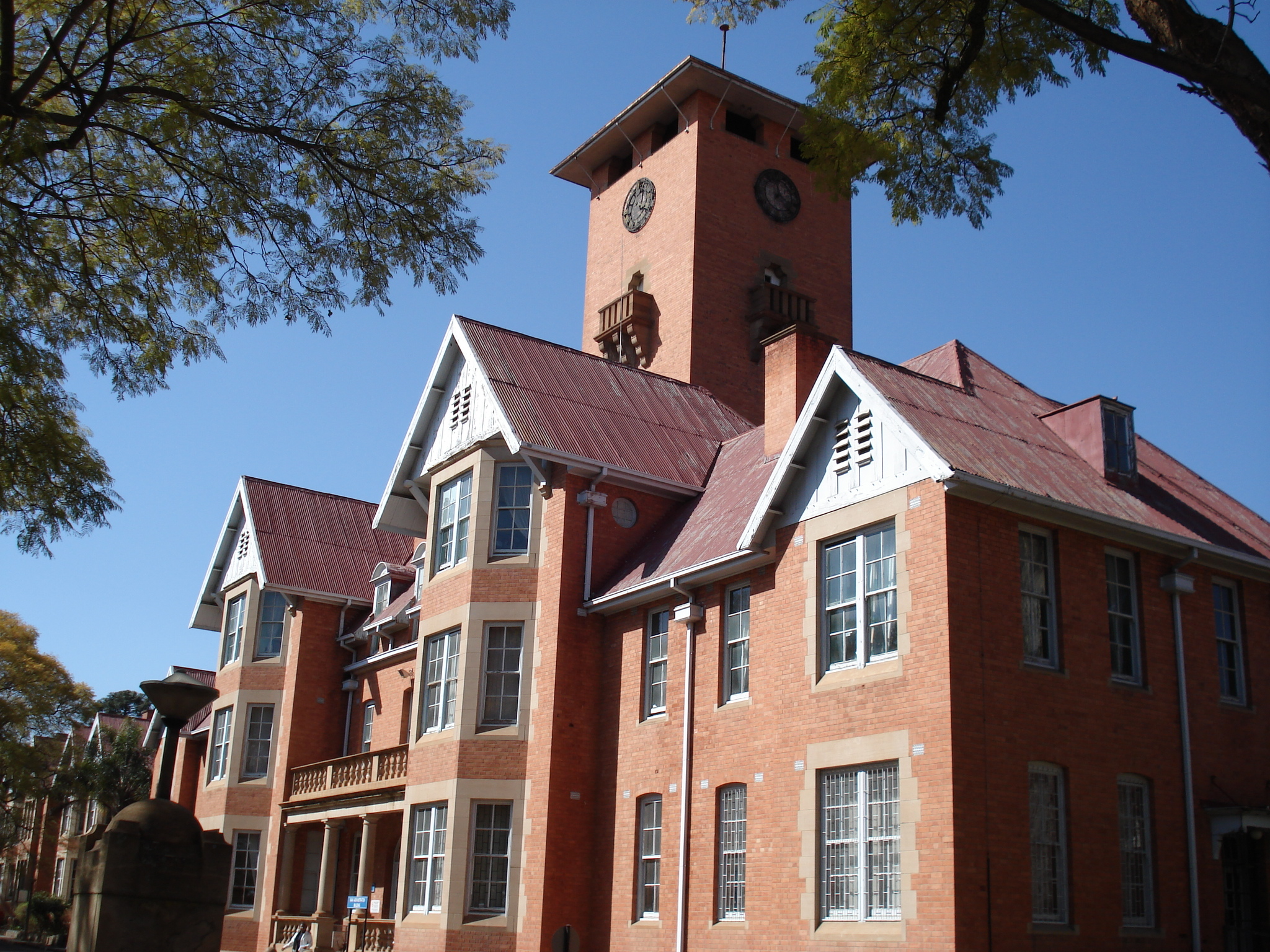

Geography
- Location: Salvokop, Pretoria, Gauteng, South Africa
- Coordinates: 25°45′27″S 28°09′54″E

Organisation
- Care system: Public
- Type: Psychiatric
- Affiliated university: University of Pretoria Sefako Makgatho Health Sciences University

Services
- Beds: 1400

History
- Founded: 1892

Weskoppies is a public psychiatric hospital in Pretoria, Gauteng. It is situated to the west of the city centre and was built on the site of the old botanical gardens.

The hospital is used by the University of Pretoria and the Sefako Makgatho Health Sciences University, and others, as a teaching hospital.

== History ==
In 1892 the first psychiatric institution in the Zuid-Afrikaansche Republiek, the Krankzinnigengesticht te Pretoria (Pretoria Lunatic Asylum), was established in 1892, later being renamed as the Weskoppies Hospital.
