= Wang Qiang (serial killer) =

Chinese serial killer and rapist (1975–2005)

- 王强
- Born: Wang Qiang; 16 January 1975; Budayuan Town, Kuandian Manchu Autonomous County, Liaoning, China
- Died: 17 November 2005 (aged 30); Shenyang, China
- Cause of death: Execution by firing squad
- Convictions: Murder x45 Rape x10 Robbery x34
- Penalty: Death

Details
- Victims: 45–60+
- Span of crimes: 1992 – 2003 (claimed); 1995 – 2003 (confirmed)
- Country: China
- State: Liaoning
- Date apprehended: 14 July 2003

Wang Qiang (Chinese: 王强; pinyin: Wáng Qiáng; 16 January 1975 – 17 November 2005) was a Chinese serial killer, rapist, and robber from Liaoning, and one of the most prolific murderers in Chinese history.

== Early life ==
Wang was born in 1975 and grew up in the small village of Kaiyuan, Liaoning. His father was physically and emotionally abusive towards his family, addicted to drinking and gambling, and denied Wang the chance to enter school. Due to the abuse, Wang eventually left home and lived on the streets.

Wang Qiang said that he never experienced family happiness during his childhood. When he was 8 years old, his parents divorced. His 6-year-old brother stayed with his mother, while Wang Qiang stayed with his father. Not long after the divorce, Wang Qiang's father got into a fight with someone due to gambling, seriously injuring another person, and was sentenced to 11 years in prison. The upbringing of Wang Qiang then fell to his grandparents.

In 1990, at the Shenyang Railway Station Square, Wang was surrounded and beaten to near-death by a group of fellow beggars. Days after he was released from the police station, Wang was taken in by an older man who gave him a meal and told him "only by stealing would he get ahead". Wang began pickpocketing, with most of the stolen money going to the man who housed him. In June 1991, Wang stole a wallet and was sent to a labor camp for two years.

After being released from the labor camp, Wang Qiang didn't go home or look for his "mentor." Instead, he went directly to Shenyang Railway Station and began pickpocketing. Wang Qiang felt that pickpocketing was too slow and tiring; robbery was much faster. Due to this, he bought a knife and started looking for targets. His first robbery occurred one autumn night in 1993, around 8 PM. In an alley on Taiyuan Street, Wang Qiang saw a man in his thirties. He and his accomplices rushed at him, knocked him down, and stole 20,000 yuan from his suit jacket. Having experienced this success, his crimes escalated.

== Murders and rapes ==
Wang committed his first confirmed murder on 22 January 1995. Official records show Wang was convicted of 45 murders, 10 rapes, and 34 robberies, and that most of his crimes were committed in public parks. Some young girls were raped post-mortem. During his attacks, which he was often accompanied in by other violent criminals, he would attack men suddenly and rob and rape his female victims.

After his arrest, Wang cooperated with investigators and led them to the scenes of his crimes. He recalled one instance in Xutai Village on 6 July 2000, when he saw a family of three sleeping and smashed their heads with a pickaxe and raped the dead young girl. Wang claimed to have begun killing in 1992, but this was not verified.

== Arrest, trial, and execution ==
Wang was implicated by his accomplices who were imprisoned and was arrested on 14 July 2003. His interrogation lasted a year and a half, with Wang gradually confessing.

Wang Qiang recounted his criminal experiences, but contrary to expectations, his almost perverse criminal behavior stemmed from a simple life as a "thug." "He said he went down this path mostly because of family reasons."

Wang Qiang was prosecuted for robbery, murder and rape. Along with Wang Qiang, his fellow villagers Zhao Junpeng, Zhao Junwei, Yang Xingbo and Zhang Baiyan were also tried. They were all prosecuted for murder and robbery. [1]

== See also ==
- List of serial killers in China
- List of serial killers by number of victims
- Yang Xinhai
- Liu Mingwu
- Xu Guangcai
