= Yang Shuming =

Chinese serial killer (1966–2006)

- 杨树明
- Shuming in 2006
- Born: 1966; Shanxi, China
- Died: 21 November 2006 (aged 40); Yangquan, China
- Cause of death: Execution by shooting
- Other name: "The Red-Clothed Killer"
- Children: 1+
- Status: Executed
- Conviction: Murder (9 counts)
- Penalty: Death

Details
- Victims: 9 killed; 3 injured
- Span of crimes: 1992–2006
- Country: China
- State: Shanxi
- Date apprehended: 28 April 2006

Yang Shuming (Chinese:杨树明; 1966 – 21 November 2006) was a Chinese serial killer who, between 1992 and 2006, murdered nine women and girls aged 16–42 and injured three other people in Majiaping, Kuangqu, Yangquan, China. His modus operandi typically consisted of stabbing his victims from behind at night, or on rainy and snowy days. Many of his victims wore red clothing while they were assaulted, leading to some media outlets referring to him as The Red-Clothed Killer. He was arrested on 28 April 2006, two months after his final attack, and executed by shooting on 21 November 2006.

== Personal life ==
In 1966, Yang was born in a residential area of Shanxi. His parents were loving to him, and he got along with his siblings well. He got a job in junior high school. Around the same time, he met his future wife, and the two quickly fell in love. When the couple married, Yang's parents were initially apprehensive towards the decision, but they changed their minds once they saw how much the two loved each other.

Although timid, his neighbors respected him for his kindness and good behavior. He was also noted for his good work ethic, being employed by the Shanxi Yangquan Coal Mining Group as a welder for over 10 years at the time of his arrest.

== Murders ==
On the evening of 2 March 1992, 16-year-old Zhong Rui got off a bus with two coworkers after finishing her shift at the fertilizer factory she worked at. After parting ways with her coworkers, she continued to walk down a dimly-lit street when Yang, armed with a knife, stabbed her in the back from behind, piercing her heart. As she fell to the ground, she screamed for help, alerting her colleagues, who were still in the vicinity. Zhong's coworkers immediately alerted the police after finding her on the ground, and she was taken to a hospital where she later died. The only evidence investigators were able to find was a shoe print. The investigation stalled after they ruled out the motive as a lust killing or a personal vendetta. Police later linked the murder to an attack on a 24-year-old woman five days later, but they still lacked enough evidence to make progress in the case.

On 22 April 1992, Shichun, 29, was walking to her mother's house from work. When she was 50 meters away from the home, Yang stabbed her six times with a knife. People nearby heard her cries for help and called the emergency services. She was then taken to the hospital, where she died three days later.

During the early morning of 11 July 1992, Li Xin, a 23-year-old woman, was taking her daily route to her apartment building after finishing work. However, Yang strangled her from behind and stabbed her eight times, killing her. The victim's pleas for help were heard by patrolmen in the area, but Yang had fled by the time they arrived. After this murder, police increased their nightly patrols, causing Yang to go dormant for more than a year.

On the night of 27 December 1993, Yang stabbed 30-year-old Hao Hua seven times from behind. She died shortly after being rescued by medical personnel. Her murder occurred a mere 15 meters from the first murder. Yang temporarily stopped killing after Hao's murder to care for his daughter, who was born around the same time.

On the evening of 6 May 1998, 30-year-old Zhang Xiu, an employee at a karaoke bar, vanished after going to the restroom. One day later, her coworkers found her in a boiler room after searching for her. In addition to being stabbed multiple times, the victim's stomach had been cut open, and her face and nipples had been mutilated. One year later, on 31 May 1999, Yang murdered 19-year-old Wang Hua, another karaoke bar employee. Her body was found in a vegetable field in front of a residential building.

On 15 November 1999, Yang began to follow 21-year-old Bi Ping as she walked home from work. Bi noticed this and attempted to run away, but Yang caught up to her, putting her in a chokehold. He proceeded to stab her several times in the abdomen, killing her.

After Bi's murder, police again heightened patrols, causing him to go dormant. He struck on noon, when there were fewer patrols, the next time on 10 October 2001. That day, 42-year-old Guo Qin went missing while passing out advertisements for work. Yang approached her and invited her into his home, to which she obliged. Upon entering his residence, he tied her up and beat her. As Guo was nearing death, he fatally strangled her with a rope. He then dismembered her. Locals found three packages containing her remains between 13 October and 24 October. Before that point, investigators had speculated that the perpetrator was a foreigner. However, due to the places where Guo's remains were found, as well as the short time between the discoveries, investigators changed their minds, now believing that the murderer was a local who had lived in the community for more than a decade. They found 100 people who matched this description, including Yang. They further narrowed down their suspect list to 25 people after determining that some of Guo's remains had been refrigerated. Detectives subsequently questioned Yang, but found nothing connecting him to the murders.

At 9:00 p.m. on 24 November 2004, Tang Rui, a young supermarket employee, began to walk home from her job. Once she reached a dark, isolated area, Yang grabbed her from behind and fatally stabbed her in the abdomen and neck.

=== Summary ===
#	Name	Age	Date	Cause of death
1	Zhong Rui	16	2 March 1992	Stab wound to the heart
2	Shichun	29	22 April 1992	Stab wounds
3	Li Xin	23	11 July 1992	Stab wounds
4	Hao Hua	30	27 December 1993	Stab wounds
5	Zhang Xiu	30	6 May 1998	Stab wounds
6	Wang Hua	19	31 May 1999	Stab wounds to the abdomen
7	Bi Ping	21	15 November 1999	Stab wounds to the abdomen
8	Guo Qin	42	10 October 2001	Strangulation
9	Tang Rui	18+	24 November 2004	Stab wounds to the abdomen and neck

== Apprehension ==
On the night of 31 January 2006, Yang went outside to search for another victim. After searching for a while, he found no women to target. He did, however, spot a drunk man standing under a streetlight near a substation. Although he did not typically target men over fear of being overpowered, and the lack of pleasure he received from stabbing them, he decided to attack the man because he could not find any other potential victims. Yang stabbed the man multiple times, missing his vital organs, before fleeing. The victim survived.

Police, still unable to identify the perpetrator, contacted Ding Tongchun, a psychology professor at the People's Public Security University of China, for help in their investigation. Ding, along with two graduate students of his, traveled to Yangquan with a polygraph to assist with the case. Ding's plan was to question each of the 25 suspects by asking them 76 questions about the murders while they were hooked up to the polygraph. Questioning started on 23 March 2006, and Yang was the first to be questioned. During the test, Yang frequently coughed, sniffled his nose, and displayed odd breathing patterns despite not being ill. That afternoon, Yang was called in for questioning again, and he appeared calm during that interview. Ding and his students gradually ruled out the other 24 suspects. On 25 March, police set up strict surveillance on Yang and called him in for questioning again, but he refused.

On 28 April 2006, police detained Yang and put him under interrogation. At the same time, police searched his home and discovered over 20 knives. Immediately after his arrest, he commended investigators for efforts, stating, "you guys are smart. From the test to the arrest, I didn't confess I was a murderer. Otherwise, I would have stabbed you all to death." He subsequently made a full confession, during which he stated his motive was revenge against society, as he felt it was unfair that the people around him were living better lives than him.

== Execution ==
At 9:50 a.m. on 21 November 2006, the Intermediate People's Court read their judgement. The judgement was approved by the Shanxi High People's Court, and Yang was sentenced to death. As the execution order was read, Yang remained expressionless. Officers then transferred Yang to the execution ground, where he was shot to death.

== See also ==
- List of serial killers in China
- Capital punishment in China
- Duan Guocheng – another Chinese serial killer who targeted women wearing red clothing
