= Guo Longhai =

Chinese serial killer and rapist

- 郭龙海
- Guo after his arrest
- Born: 1960s Shandong, China
- Died: January 13, 2002; Duyun, Guizhou, China
- Cause of death: Execution by shooting
- Convictions: Murder x14 Rape
- Penalty: 10 years, commuted to 7 years (first rape); Death (murders)

Details
- Victims: 14
- Span of crimes: 1995–2001
- Country: China
- States: Guizhou; Guangxi
- Date apprehended: For the final time on May 8, 2001

Guo Longhai (Chinese: 郭龙海; 1960s – January 13, 2002) was a Chinese serial killer and rapist who raped and killed 14 young girls and women in Guizhou and Guangxi from 1995 to 2001 as revenge for being imprisoned for rape in 1983. Arrested after his final would-be victim survived, he was tried, convicted, and subsequently executed for the crimes in 2002.

== Early life and rape conviction ==
Born sometime during the 1960s in Shandong, China, Guo was brought to Duyun by his father in 1968. After graduating from middle school, he found a job at a local factory, got married, and worked his way up to being a respected senior employee. He eventually took notice of a younger female co-worker, Xiao Jiao (a pseudonym used by the media), who was in an on-and-off relationship with another senior employee. One night after watching a movie at their workplace, Guo went to the women's dormitory and forced Xiao into having sex under the pretense of telling the higher-ups about her affair. Afraid of being fired, Xiao submitted to him and promised not to tell anyone.

In 1983, a college student was assigned to the factory and befriended Guo. He informed the older man that he wanted to seduce Xiao, but one day, while the two were drinking, Guo suddenly bragged to him that he had taken advantage of her. Shocked by the confession, the college student went to the police station and reported the incident to the authorities, who immediately arrested Guo. When questioned, Xiao finally confessed that she had been raped—a claim denied by Guo, who claimed that it was consensual. In the end, he was found guilty of rape and sentenced to 10 years imprisonment, which was later commuted to 7 years due to good behavior.

=== Release ===
After his release in 1990, Guo's wife accepted him back into their family despite his rape conviction and unfaithfulness. Unable to get a job at first, he resorted to selling cigarettes and calendars on the streets before finally getting a position at an agricultural company. Owing to his diligent work ethic, he was eventually promoted to manager. Despite the improvements in his personal life, Guo frequently thought about Xiao and how she had supposedly wrongfully gotten him thrown in jail, leading to him developing a seething hatred towards women in general. At one point, he attempted to track her down but was unsuccessful, as she had left Duyun a long time ago.

== Murders ==
In the first half of 1995, Guo was at the Duyun Railway Station when he engaged a random young woman in conversation. After chatting for some time, the pair decided to have a meal and go shopping, during which Guo bought some clothing for her. In his interrogations later on, Guo claimed that at one point she started reminding him of Xiao and decided to kill her. He told the woman that he was going to Dushan County and asked if she would accompany him, to which the woman agreed. The pair eventually traveled to Mawan Village and had sex in a secluded spot, and immediately after that, Guo told her that he was a fortune teller who could tell her future if he tied her hands. The woman agreed, but shortly after being tied up with a belt, Guo told her of his previous experience, went into a rage, and proceeded to manually strangle her. He would later claim that while he was initially scared at first, he eventually got used to the idea of killing people and decided that from then on he would kill any woman whom he considered "greedy".

A couple of months later, Guo was on a business trip in Liuzhou, Guangxi, when he became acquainted with another woman. He would convince this victim to go to the mountainous areas in Xincheng County, where, after having sex with her, he would strangle her to death. In March 1996, while on another business trip to Yizhou, he met another woman and coerced her in a similar manner to visit the Shangkundong Mountain near Hechi, where he strangled her after having sex.

After killing three more victims in different parts of Guizhou and Guangxi, Guo settled on finding easily-accessible victims in Duyun. Among the first of them was a 13-year-old mentally ill student who was lured from the train station and towards the mountains, where she was strangled after having sex with Guo. On May 15, 2000, he lured a student to an isolated pavilion near a government office building and offered to have sex with her. The student refused, causing Guo to grab her neck with both hands and strangle her into unconsciousness. Thinking that she was dead, he moved the student to a nearby ditch, but she was found in time and driven to the hospital, where she soon recovered from her injuries.

=== Investigation ===
As the bodies continued to pile up, forensic doctors deduced that most of the victims, who were presumed to be predominantly prostitutes from neighboring provinces, were sexually assaulted and killed in a similar manner, indicating a possible serial killer was active in the area. Using this information, investigators started looking into any previously convicted sex offenders and organized stake-outs at the railway station and other areas frequented by prostitutes and vulnerable young women.

== Arrest, trial, and execution ==
In the early hours of November 26, 2000, Guo struck up a conversation with a 27-year-old woman at the Duyun Railway Station, as he had recognized her playing at the local mahjong hall a couple of days prior. After chatting for a bit, he invited her over to his house to play, to which the woman agreed. Along the way, Guo claimed that he had divorced his wife and had rented an apartment, but in order to prevent the landlord from finding out that he had visitors, he had to bring her in from a back door. When they arrived in the mountainous area, he suddenly changed his demeanor and ordered her to undress. After having sex with her, Guo attempted to strangle her, but the woman managed to fight back and free herself from his grasp. To his surprise, she did not run away and even offered him a cigarette, telling him that killing her would do him no good and that it would not help with his life struggles. Impressed by her bravery, he took the cigarette, but while Guo was lighting it up, the woman managed to run away and tell what had happened to her friends the following day. This information was relayed to the authorities, who started investigating every man matching the description provided by the surviving victim.

On May 8, 2001, Guo was arrested by police officers while walking on the street. Shortly after his arrest, investigators obtained several blood samples and sent them for testing, with almost all of them returning positive matches with forensic evidence found at the crime scenes. In the meantime, Guo openly confessed all of his crimes to the investigators, claiming that he had killed 14 women in Duyun, Liuzhou, Guiding County, Hechi, and other places. He also bragged that his case overshadowed notorious killers like Zhang Jun and Zhang Ziqiang, and that Jame Gumb from The Silence of the Lambs could not compare with him. Later on, however, he would claim in a much more apologetic manner that he knew that technology would catch up to him and that he could not stop himself from killing.

In October 2001, Guo was convicted on all counts by the Qiannan Intermediate People's Court and sentenced to death. He refused to appeal his sentence and was executed on January 13, 2002, at the execution ground in Duyun. His alleged last words were, "I want to see my wife again. She has always been good to me, and I am sorry for her and my son."

== See also ==
- List of serial killers in China
