= List of serial killers in China =

Mainland China has experienced numerous serial killers—individuals who have murdered three or more people over an extended period of time—throughout its history.

The number of serial killers and mass murderers active in the country spiked in the 1990s, which researchers attributed to the "heavy pressure" many Chinese felt during the rapid social change of the period due to the reform and opening up.

Below is a list of recorded serial killers who were active in the country, with Wikipedia articles of their own.

== Pre-PRC serial killers ==
Serial killers active before the formation of the People's Republic of China in 1949.

Name	Years active	Proven victims	Possible victims	Status	Summary	Ref.
Liu Pengli, Prince of Jidong	2nd century BC	100+	100+	Stripped of his authority and banished to Zhushan County before c. 116 BC	Han prince who would go on marauding expeditions at night with his slaves, robbing and murdering villagers for sport. After a complaint was filed, the Emperor (his uncle) declared Liu a commoner and banished him to the county of Shangyong.	(Note: See Records of the Grand Historian/Book of Han)

== Identified modern serial killers ==
Name	Years active	Proven victims	Possible victims	Status	Summary	Ref.
Bai Baoshan (Note: Had an accomplice or accomplices in some of the murders)	1996–1997 (Note: While this is the confirmed timespan, they are suspected to have begun killing years earlier.)	15	17	Executed by shooting in 1998	In March 1996, Bai was released from prison after serving 13 years for a robbery-assault committed in 1983. Angered by his imprisonment, Bai began a crime spree, murdering police, soldiers, and civilians and committing robberies. He was aided by an accomplice, Wu Ziming, in some of the crimes. Bai would later kill Wu during a dispute over money. In September 1997, he was apprehended at his home in Beijing. According to Bai, he beat two inmates to death with a hammer during his first incarceration.	
Chen Fuzhao	2003	17	17	Executed by shooting in 2004	Dermatologist who mixed rat poison in drinks and gave them to beggars in Longgang, Zhejiang.	
Chen Yongfeng	2003	10	10	Executed in 2004	Man from Wenzhou who worked in waste recycling. Aware that his co-workers carried money, he lured them to his home over the course of four months on the pretext of selling waste items. He then killed them, stole their belongings, and dismembered the bodies. Eventually, he was caught during the act and sentenced to death.	
Cheng Ruilong	1996–2005	11	13	Executed by lethal injection in 2010	Robbed, raped, and murdered people for nine years across China, sometimes with accomplices, while living under a false identity.	
Dong Wenyu	2006	6	6	Executed by shooting in 2007	Active in four provinces, Dong killed six people, seriously injured another, raped women, and committed several robberies within three months.	
Du Runqiong, Tang Youhua	1995	18	18	Executed by shooting in 1996 (both)	Superstitious mother and son who carried out mass poisonings between June and December 1995, resulting in the deaths of 18 people and thousands of animals.	
Duan Guocheng	1999–2001	13	13	Sentenced to death in 2003	Nicknamed the "Red-Dress Killer"; committed dozens of robberies and murdered young women walking unaccompanied at night through dimly lit streets in Wuhan.	
Fa Ziying, Lao Rongzhi	1996–1999	7	7	Executed by shooting in 1999 (Fa); Executed by lethal injection in 2023 (Lao)	Con artist couple who committed a series of crimes—involving kidnapping, robbery, and murder—between 1996 and 1999. Fa was arrested and executed in 1999, while Lao went on the run and was captured 20 years later. Lao was executed in 2023.	
Gao Chengyong	1988; 1994–2002	11	11	Executed in 2019	Known as the "Chinese Jack the Ripper"; raped and murdered 11 women over the course of 14 years. In some instances, he mutilated the victims postmortem, removing their hands, breasts, and reproductive organs. He was apprehended in 2016 after 14 years of inactivity, due to DNA evidence.	
Gong Runbo	2005–2006	6	28+	Executed by shooting in 2006	Between 1996 and 2004, Gong served a prison sentence for raping a 15-year-old girl. After his release, he murdered six children in Jiamusi over the course of 11 months and molested at least five others. While Gong was at an Internet café (where he had met most of his victims) on 28 February 2006, a boy escaped his apartment and notified the police. In his home, they discovered the decomposing remains of four children. He was then arrested and executed on 31 December.	
Guo Longhai	1995–2001	14	14	Executed by shooting in 2002	Served a prison sentence from 1983 to 1990 for raping a female co-worker. After his release, he began murdering women after becoming acquainted with them, which later escalated to rapes and murders of young girls and sex workers.	
Hu Daoping	2003–2005	7	7	Executed by shooting in 2006	Escaped from prison while serving a sentence for robbery. While on the run, he committed additional robberies, killing seven people in the process.	
Hua Ruizhuo	1998–2001	14	14	Executed by shooting in 2002	Murdered fourteen sex workers in Beijing after discovering that his girlfriend was secretly working as one.	
Huang Yong	2001–2003	17	25+	Executed by shooting in 2003	Convicted of murdering 17 teenage boys in Henan, although he confessed to his final would-be victim that he killed "at least 25". His victims were lured from Internet cafés and arcades to his home on the pretext of job offers.	
Jia Jianhu	1998–2003	12	12	Executed by shooting in 2004	Murdered twelve sex workers across China as revenge for perceived wrongs society had done to him.	
Li Guangjun	2006	7	7	Sentenced to death in 2007	After serving a lengthy prison sentence for rape, Li raped and murdered seven women in areas along National Highway 310 between February and November 2006. His first victim was his estranged wife's sister, whose home he visited to ask for help locating her. In a 2008 prison interview, Li claimed that he did not consider himself a murderer and said that he killed women who were "unfaithful to their husbands".	
Li Pingping	1995; 2002–2003	7	7	Executed by shooting in 2004	Murdered his former manager, Song Shutian, in 1995, along with Song's wife and daughter. Between 2002 and 2003, he murdered four sex workers he met outside of karaoke bars.	
Li Shikang	1999	6	6	Unknown	Blamed doctors for being unable to cure his STD and held the paranoid belief that his children would be infected by regular contact. Due to this frustration, he sent bombs to the homes of doctors and a clinic, killing six and injuring 17 others. He was later apprehended, but the outcome of his trial is not publicly known.	
Li Wenxiang	1991–1996	13	13	Sentenced to death in 1996	Nicknamed the "Guangzhou Ripper"; murdered and mutilated impoverished sex workers. He was captured after one of his intended victims survived and identified him to the police.	
Li Yijiang	1994; 2002–2003	7	7	Executed by shooting in 2004	Committed his first murder at the age of 14. Later, in 2002, he was gang-raped by four men he had met through an online pornography website. After the rape, he lured each victim separately to their deaths. He also killed two others during this period.	
Li Zhanguo	1991–1995	11	11	Sentenced to death in 1995	Raped and murdered 11 mentally ill teenagers and young men in Henan. Sentenced to death and executed at an unknown date.	
Liu Mingwu	1992; 2001–2002	23	23+	Executed by shooting in 2002	Vagrant beggar who killed other beggars due to his hatred of the homeless, whom he described as being "dirty and smelly". After being spotted with a blood-stained knife, he freely confessed to the murders, though he said he had lost track of how many he killed. Investigators were able to tie him to a minimum of 23.	
Long Zhimin, Yan Shuxia	1983–1985	48	48+	Executed by shooting in 1985 (both)	Long and his wife, Yan Shuxia, lured people into their home on the pretext of meeting high-paying employers, then killed them and buried their remains on the property.	
Luo Shubiao	1977; 1990–1994	19	19	Executed by shooting in 1995	Known as the "Rainy Night Butcher"; Luo murdered and mutilated sex workers he picked up in Tianhe, Guangzhou, later dumping their bodies in isolated locations. He was also connected to an earlier murder in 1977.	
Peng Cheng	1988–1995	6	6	Executed by shooting in 1995	Dog breeder from Yinchuan who murdered six people and fed some of the remains to his dogs. During his spree, Peng and one of his dogs were featured in An Old Man and His Dog, which, after his arrest, led to the film's decades-long ban.	
Qian Yongchang	1959; 1974; 1994–1995	15	15	Executed by shooting in 1995	Qian pushed a co-worker off a cliff in 1959 to cover up an affair. In 1974, after being released from prison for numerous thefts, he committed two robbery-murders. Later in life, he went on an extensive crime spree, killing 12 people in the process.	
Shen Changyin, Shen Changping	1999; 2003–2004	11	11	Executed by lethal injection in 2006 (both)	Cannibal brothers who murdered and ate the kidneys of 11 sex workers with the help of four accomplices.	
Song Jinghua	1996; 2005–2007	10	10	Executed by shooting in 2011	After being released from prison for murdering a taxi driver with his older brother in 1996, Song murdered nine women who reminded him of his brother's ex-girlfriend. She had testified at his brother's trial, and Song blamed her for his execution. Song, along with an accomplice, were both executed in 2011.	
Wang Qiang	1995–2003	45	46+	Executed by shooting in 2005	In 1990, Wang was beaten to near-death by a group of fellow beggars; he was then taken in by an older man, who taught him that "only by stealing would he get ahead". After following the man's advice, Wang was eventually arrested, and upon his release, he began a crime spree with the help of several accomplices. He was convicted of 45 murders, 10 rapes, and 34 robberies, but he confessed to and is suspected of being responsible for others, including a murder in 1992.	
Wang Wanming	1992–1998	20	20	Executed by shooting in 1999	Committed 52 rapes and 20 murders in Shaanxi in the 1990s.	
Wang Zongfang, Wang Zongwei	1983	10	10	Killed during manhunt in 1983 (both)	Brothers who went on a seven-month crime spree in 1983, killing civilians, police, and soldiers during robberies and arrest attempts. Both shot dead in Guangchang County.	
Xu Guangcai	1987–1990	6	6	Executed by shooting in 1990	Lured six women from Beijing train stations by offering them jobs or asking them out for dinner, after which he would rape and murder them in remote fields. After police noticed a pattern in the murders, they began a sting operation. Xu was apprehended after attempting to murder an undercover officer and was sentenced to death.	
Yang Shuming	1992–1993; 1998–2004	9	9	Executed by shooting in 2006	Nicknamed the "Red-Clothed Killer" due to many of his victims having worn red at the time of their deaths. Yang murdered nine women in Kuangqu, Yangquan, taking a four-and-a-half-year break after the birth of his daughter. He targeted women walking alone at night, stabbing them from behind. His last intended victim survived, and he was apprehended after acting suspiciously during interrogation.	
Yang Xinhai	2000–2003	67	67	Executed by shooting in 2004	Nicknamed the "Monster Killer"; Yang was an itinerant laborer who served multiple prison sentences between 1988 and 1999. After his final release, he traveled the country and entered rural homes at night, killing entire families. During an unrelated police inspection of an entertainment venue in Cangzhou, Yang was apprehended. He freely confessed to the murders and allegedly said his motive was revenge against society as a result of a breakup. Later reports claimed that he simply enjoyed murder and quoted him as saying he had a "desire" to kill people.	
Zhang Jun	1993–2000	28	28	Executed by shooting in 2001	Robbed 22 stores, killing 28 people and injuring 23 others in the process. Zhang was accompanied by others in some of the robberies. In April 2001, he was sentenced to death and executed a month later.	
Zhang Yongming	1979; 2008–2012	12	12	Executed in 2013	Cannibal who murdered eleven men near his home between 2008 and 2012, feeding some of the remains to his dogs and unsuspecting people at a local market, where it was sold as "ostrich meat". In his home, police discovered drying human flesh and eyeballs preserved in wine bottles. Zhang also served a sentence for intentional homicide in 1979.	
Zhao Zhihong	1996; 2000; 2005	11	11	Executed by shooting in 2019	Raped and murdered women between 1996 and 2005. His case is notable for the fact that an innocent man was convicted and executed for a murder he committed in a Hohhot restroom in 1996.	
Zhou Kehua	2004–2005; 2009–2012	10	10	Killed during manhunt in 2012	Arms trafficker and robber who murdered ten people across China. He was fatally shot by police in 2012 after being designated a class-A wanted criminal by the Ministry of Public Security.	
Zhou Wen	2003	6	6	Executed in 2004	Nicknamed the "Taxi Demon"; taxi driver from Anshan who strangled six female passengers with a rope. He wrote a diary for police detailing each of his crimes.	
Zhou Youping	2009	6	6	Executed in 2014	Strangled six men in hotels. Zhou met his victims on BDSM websites, advertising that he was looking for a "slave" to play erotic suffocation games with.	

== See also ==
- Lists of serial killers
  - List of serial killers by country
- List of rampage killers in China
- List of school attacks in China

== Cited works ==
- Flowers, R. Barri (2012). The Dynamics of Murder: Kill or Be Killed. Boca Raton, Florida: CRC Press. ISBN 9781439879740. Archived from the original on September 1, 2016.
- Holmes, Ronald M.; Holmes, Stephen T. (1998). Serial Murder (Second ed.). Thousand Oaks, California: Sage. ISBN 978-0-7619-1367-2. Archived from the original on May 14, 2019.
- Petherick, Wayne (2005). Serial Crime: Theoretical and Practical Issues in Behavioral Profiling. Burlington, Massachusetts: Elsevier. ISBN 9780080468549. Archived from the original on September 2, 2016.
- Schechter, Harold (2012). The A to Z Encyclopedia of Serial Killers. New York City: Simon & Schuster. ISBN 9781439138854. Archived from the original on September 1, 2016.
