= Wu Jun (disambiguation) =

Wu Jun may also refer to:

- Wu Jun (吴军; born May 1972), a Chinese politician
- Hu Daoping, also known as Wu Jun, a serial killer who was executed by shooting
- Wu Jun (victim) (吴军; born c. 1963–?), a survivor of a 2008 robbery-murder in Singapore
- Wu Jun (historian) (吳均; 469–520) a Southern Liang Dynasty historian
