= Shuming =

Shuming is a given name. Notable people with the name include:

- He Shuming, Singaporean film director and screenwriter
- Liang Shuming, Chinese philosopher, politician, and writer
- Lu Shuming, Chinese actor
- Nie Shuming, Chinese-American chemist
- Wang Shuming, Chinese pilot and officer
- Yang Shuming, Chinese serial killer
