= Dong Wenyu =

Chinese serial killer and rapist

- 董文语
- Mug shot
- Born: 1978; Pingyang County, Zhejiang, China
- Died: November 28, 2007 (aged 28–29); Jinhua, China
- Cause of death: Executed
- Conviction: Murder
- Penalty: Death

Details
- Victims: 6
- Span of crimes: March – May 2006
- Country: China
- States: Zhejiang; Fujian; Jiangxi
- Date apprehended: November 16, 2006

Dong Wenyu (Chinese: 董文语; 1978 – November 28, 2007) was a Chinese serial killer, rapist, and necrophile, responsible for a string of robbery-murders across three provinces between March and May 2006. He was sentenced to death and subsequently executed for his crimes the following year.

== Early life and crimes ==
Wenyu was born in Pingyang County, Zhejiang, in 1978. Wenyu's parents divorced while he was in elementary school, with his mother remarrying in another country, leaving Wenyu in the care of his grandmother. His father had a past checkered with theft convictions and wasn't well-liked in the village. He became even less concerned about his son after the divorce, leading to the 11-year-old Wenyu running away from home while in the second grade.

In 1998, he was sentenced to one year and six months imprisonment for malicious injury and released in April 1999. A few months later, on September 10, he was rearrested for theft in Hangzhou and received a sentence of two years and six months, which expired on March 9, 2002.

== Murders, investigation and capture ==
From March to May 2006, Wenyu drifted between the Fujian, Zhejiang, and Jiangxi provinces, as well as others. His modus operandi was to climb through a window at night, armed with a knife, and break into residential buildings to carry out his criminal activities. During his crime spree, six people were murdered (five of them women), two were injured (one seriously), and four women were raped. The crimes were extremely cruel; if the owners were woken up by the noises, he would slit their throats with the knife and, with some of the female victims, rape their still-fresh corpses.

On July 6, 2006, the Ministry of Public Security issued a Class A arrest warrant, initiating a nation-wide manhunt for Dong Wenyu.

In the early morning of November 16, Wenyu climbed into a villager's house in Xiangi Town, Yibin, Sichuan. He stole a mobile phone and climbed out of the window onto the dirt road, but the homeowner awoke and called him out. Wenyu tried to flee but broke his right leg in the process, leading to his capture by the villagers. The local police confirmed his identity by reviewing the items he carried with him—a wanted poster and a diary.

The following day, he was indicted by the Jiangnan Branch of Jinhua's Public Security Bureau for suspected homicide. On December 20, it was upheld by the Procuratorate of the Wucheng District. On November 20, Wenyu was returned to Jinhua, with thousands of people gathering to observe his arrival. On April 26, 2007, the People's Procuratorate of Jinhua filed an indictment against Dong Wenyu for homicide, robbery, rape, theft, and humiliation of a corpse.

== Trial and verdict ==
On May 16, the Jinhua Intermediate People's Court opened the first trial for the murder series, holding it in private because of privacy concerns.

On June 8, the court found him guilty of all counts and sentenced him to death, depriving him of political rights for the rest of his life, handing him a fine of 5,000 yuan, and confiscating all of his personal property. In addition, the court also fined Wenyu 520,000 yuan for various economic losses from the accompanying civil lawsuit. After the announcement of the sentence, he did not appeal it within the legal time limit.

During a subsequent psychiatric exam, according to Wenyu's own account, his childhood love of family violence and misfortune led to his strong antisocial behavior.

== Execution ==
On July 18, 2007, the Zhejiang Provincial People's Higher Court agreed to send an appeal for the conviction to the Supreme People's Court, which promptly ruled that the death penalty is an appropriate sentence for Dong Wenyu.

On November 28, 2007, Dong Wenyu was executed in Jinhua.

== See also ==
- List of serial killers in China
