= Long Zhimin =

Chinese serial killer

- 龙治民
- Long in police custody
- Born: Unknown; Shang County, Shaanxi, China
- Died: September 27, 1985; Shang County, Shaanxi, China
- Cause of death: Execution by shooting
- Conviction: Murder
- Penalty: Death

Details
- Victims: 48
- Span of crimes: 1983–1985
- Country: China
- State: Shaanxi
- Date apprehended: May 28, 1985

Long Zhimin (Chinese: 龙治民; pinyin: Lóng Zhìmín; died September 27, 1985) was a Chinese serial killer. Together with his wife Yan Shuxia, he murdered 48 people in Shaanxi between 1983 and 1985. This criminal case shocked the Zhongnanhai and the Chinese State Council, and is referred to as the Long Zhimin Couple's Homicides (龙治民夫妇杀人案).

== Murders ==
Long Zhimin was a farmer originally from Shang County (now Shangzhou District, Shangluo). In the spring of 1974, due to the construction of the Nanqin Reservoir, he moved to Wangjian Village (王墹村), Yangyuhe Township (now Yangyuhe Town). Four years later, he married Yan Shuxia, a disabled woman with meningitis.

Between March 1983 and May 1985, Long, with the help of his wife, deceived 48 people (31 men and 17 women) into his home with promises of introducing them to upper-class people and high-paying employers by simply offering free accommodation. When the victims entered the house, they were killed and subsequently buried on the property.

On May 28, 1985, the police arrested Long Zhimin and searched his house upon requests from the family members of the missing people. A total of three mass graves were found, with 48 bodies in them (two others were found next to the wheat straw pile, and another one in a bag with fertilizer and tools).

== Trial and execution ==
On August 30, 1985, the Shangluo Branch of the Shaanxi Procuratore charged Long Zhimin and his wife with murder. On September 20, the Shangluo Intermediate Court sentenced both defendants to death. They filed an appeal, but the Higher People's Court rejected it and upheld the death penalty. Only seven days after the sentencing, Long and Yan were executed.

== Motives ==
According to medical experts, the initial motives for Long's murders was to obtain property, free labor and meet sexual requirements. As the killings progressed, it evolved into an addiction, from which he likely experienced great pleasure.

== Reveal ==
At the end of 2011, the Shaanxi Provincial Public Security Chronicles declassified the crimes, and even published photos of Long Zhimin.

== See also ==
- List of serial killers in China
- List of serial killers by number of victims
