= A Touch of Sin =

2013 Chinese anthology thriller film

- Film poster
- Chinese: 天注定
- Literal meaning: heavenly fate
- Hanyu Pinyin: tiān zhùdìng
- Directed by: Jia Zhangke
- Written by: Jia Zhangke
- Produced by: Shôzô Ichiyama
- Starring: Jiang Wu; Zhao Tao; Wang Baoqiang; Luo Lanshan
- Cinematography: Yu Lik-wai
- Edited by: Matthieu Laclau; Xudong Lin
- Music by: Lim Giong
- Production companies: Xstream Pictures; Office Kitano; Shanghai Film Group; Shanxi Film & Television Group; Bandai Visual Company; Bitters End; MK2
- Release date: 17 May 2013 (Cannes)
- Running time: 130 minutes
- Countries: China; Japan; France
- Languages: Mandarin; Cantonese; English

A Touch of Sin (Chinese: 天注定; lit. 'Destiny') is a 2013 anthology thriller film written and directed by Jia Zhangke and starring Jiang Wu, Wang Baoqiang, Luo Lanshan, and Zhao Tao, Jia's wife and longtime collaborator. The film consists of four loosely interconnected tableaus set in vastly different geographical and social milieus across modern-day China, based on recent events while also drawing from wuxia stories and Chinese opera. The English title references A Touch of Zen. It was in competition for the Palme d'Or at the 2013 Cannes Film Festival, with Jia winning the award for Best Screenplay.

== Plot ==
The film consists of four loosely interconnected vignettes that are depicted chronologically, each set in a different location in China and based on then newsworthy events and incidents in China.

=== Prologue ===
Traveling on a motorbike across rural Shanxi, San'er is accosted by three thugs who attempt to rob him. Unfazed, he pulls out a pistol and shoots them dead.

=== Dahai (Shanxi) ===
Dahai is the de facto workers' representative at a privatized coal mine. Angered that the village remains poor while local officials grow rich through lying, bribery, and embezzlement of funds from the mine's operation, Dahai confronts the village chief, who dismisses his grievances. He goes about the village making his intentions to report the officials to the Central Committee in Beijing known, and is alternatingly met with quiet support, indifference, and annoyance.

Dahai's crusade comes to a head when he confronts the Jiaos, the owners of the mine, in front of the villagers. His demands are ignored and he is attacked by one of the Jiaos' hired thugs, making him the subject of ridicule. He is then visited by the Jiaos' representatives in the hospital, who compensate him with hush money.

Dahai visits his sister in a nearby town, reaffirming his vengeance against the officials. After passing by a Shanxi opera rendition of the story of Lin Chong, he retrieves a shotgun from his house and goes to the village accountant, attempting to extract a written confession regarding the chief's misdeeds. When the accountant calls him a coward, Dahai shoots him and his wife. Dahai continues his rampage, killing a lackey who ridiculed him, the village chief, a man mistreating his horse, and finally Mr. Jiao himself. Covered in blood, Dahai smiles as patrol cars approach the village.

Dahai's story is based on that of Hu Wenhai, who in 2001 went on a killing spree in response to alleged corruption in his village.

=== San'er (Chongqing) ===
San'er returns to Chongqing for Chinese New Year and to celebrate his mother's 70th birthday. His estranged wife rejects his mysterious monetary contributions to the family. On New Year's Eve, San'er bonds with his son by firing off his pistol during a fireworks show.

Following the New Year celebrations, San'er buys bus tickets for three cities seemingly at random. He tells his wife that he plans to go to Myanmar and buy a new gun, but otherwise avoids her questions. The source of San'er's income is revealed when he heads into town and methodically guns down a woman and her husband before snatching her handbag. He then leaves Chongqing but gets off the bus before reaching his destination.

San'er's story is loosely based on that of Zhou Kehua, a gunman who committed several murders and robberies between 2004 and 2012.

=== Xiaoyu (Hubei) ===
Xiaoyu meets with her lover Youliang, a married man, in Yichang, and gives him an ultimatum to divorce his wife within six months. Youliang heads to Guangdong and Xiaoyu returns to her job as a receptionist at a spa. There, she is assaulted by Youliang's wife and her hired thugs, and flees to a van offering a fortune-telling service.

Xiaoyu hitches a ride with some construction workers to see her mother. On her way back, she witnesses corrupt local officials ordering thugs to beat up a worker who refuses to pay an arbitrarily set-up toll. That night, as she leaves her shift, Xiaoyu encounters the same officials, who harass and assault her when she refuses to give in to their demands for sex. She snaps and kills one of the officials with a fruit knife left behind by Youliang. Leaving the spa in shock, she calls emergency services and confesses to the murder.

This segment is based on the Deng Yujiao incident which took place in 2009.

=== Xiaohui (Guangdong) ===
Xiaohui, a Hunan native working at a textile factory, accidentally causes a workplace injury. Unwilling to work while his wages are transferred to the injured party as compensation, he flees employment and heads to Dongguan, where he finds work at a hostess club. There, he strikes a chord with Lianrong, a hostess and another Hunan native.

Over time, Xiaohui and Lianrong grow close but Lianrong rejects Xiaohui's romantic advances and his proposal that they leave Dongguan. She reveals that she has a daughter and is only doing sex work in order to provide for her. Xiaohui witnesses Lianrong performing sexual services on a client one night and quits.

Xiaohui takes on an electronics manufacturing job he earlier rejected due to unfavorable benefits. Penniless until his next payday, he receives a call from his mother, who berates him for not sending money home. He is then caught by Chang Ling, the injured party from the textile factory. Chang and his gang prepare to beat up Xiaohui, but relent and leave. Humiliated, Xiaohui commits suicide by jumping out of his company apartment unit.

This segment is based on the spate of worker suicides in locations and facilities owned by Foxconn between 2010 and 2013.

=== Epilogue ===
Back in Shanxi, Xiaoyu attends an interview at a factory now under the management of Mrs. Jiao, the widow of Jiao. She is asked by the management for the reasons why she went a long way to Shanxi to look for a job. Mrs. Jiao seems to recall Xiaoyu's name, but she states that she is not in trouble any more. In the ending scene, Xiaoyu chances across a public opera performance, where an opera actor asks, "Do you plead guilty?!", ostensibly to Su San, the female leading role in the opera, who was wrongly accused of murder.

== Cast ==
- Jiang Wu as Dahai, a coal mine worker who is angry at the corruption which has left his village impoverished. He goes on a rampage with a gun, killing those he deems responsible.
- Wang Baoqiang as San'er, a criminal who financially supports his family by shooting people dead and then taking their possessions.
- Zhao Tao as Xiaoyu, a spa receptionist who is having a relationship with a married man. She uses a knife to murder an official who propositions her for sex. Zhao is the wife of the movie's writer and director, Jia Zhangke.
- Luo Lanshan as Xiaohui, a young man who jumps between multiple jobs, befriends a sex worker, and ends up committing suicide.

== Reception ==
Review aggregation website Rotten Tomatoes gives the film a score of 95% based on reviews from 92 critics. The site's consensus states, "Its screenplay isn't as graceful as the choreography of its action sequences, but A Touch of Sin offers enough stylishly satisfying violence to muscle past its rough spots."

A Touch of Sin was well received at Cannes, with some critics calling its genre elements, including scenes of graphic violence, a stylistic departure from some of Jia's past works, known for quiet realism and surreal visions of contemporary China. Dennis Lim of the Los Angeles Times notes that although the style may be different, the disturbing themes of the film built on the social criticism in Jia's earlier work. Manohla Dargis of The New York Times praised the film saying "it has the urgency of a screaming headline but one inscribed with visual lyricism, emotional weight and a belief in individual rights".

In 2013, A Touch of Sin was chosen by Cahiers du Cinéma as one of the annual top 10 films. In 2017, A Touch of Sin was chosen by The New York Times as one of the 25 best films of the 21st century.

== Awards ==
The film won the Georges Delerue Award for Best Soundtrack/Sound Design, by Lim Giong, at Film Fest Gent in 2013.

== Release ==
Although Jia's films have been officially released in China since 2004's The World, his earlier works were made independent of government censors and were thus never publicly released in cinemas. In May 2013 it was announced that the film had been cleared for release in mainland China with a release date of 9 November, a surprise to observers within and outside the country who feared such subject matter was taboo. By December 2013 the film still had not been cleared by censors.

== See also ==
- List of TV and films with critiques of Chinese Communist Party
