= Zhou Youping =

Executed Chinese serial killer

- 周友平
- Born: 1973; Xiangxiang, Hunan, China
- Died: 29 August 2014 (aged 40–41); Changsha, Hunan, China
- Cause of death: Execution
- Convictions: Murder x6 Robbery x1
- Penalty: Death (murders); 3 years imprisonment (robbery)

Details
- Victims: 6
- Span of crimes: 10 October – 26 November 2009
- Country: China
- State: Hunan
- Date apprehended: 28 November 2009

Zhou Youping (Chinese: 周友平; 1973 – 29 August 2014) was a Chinese serial killer and former karaoke singer who was convicted of the murder of six men, during erotic sex games in Changsha from October to November 2009, in what became known as the "Changsha serial sadomasochism death case" (Chinese: 长沙连环性虐恋致死案).

Zhou was convicted, sentenced to death and executed for his crimes.

== Early life ==
Zhou Youping was born in Xiangxiang in 1973, the second son in a family with three children. From an early age, he developed an interest in singing from his father, who was reported to be a capable singer. From an early age, Zhou was described as handsome, was constantly surrounded by girls and a top student in his town. During Zhou's childhood, his father was mortally wounded in a fight with another villager, dying three days later. The assailant was sentenced to nine years imprisonment.

In 1989, he enrolled in an art school in Hunan and joined the Huagu Opera troupe. During his time there, Zhou realized that he was gay, initially struggling with his sexuality as he feared his parents would disown him, but it is unclear if that ever occurred.

Zhou eventually dropped out and moved with his sister to Changsha, where he rented a one-room apartment. After settling in, he began singing in karaoke halls in Changsha and Xiangxiang under the stage name Dai Jun, frequently covering songs by Tengger. His handsome appearance and beautiful voice earned him moderate success, but he never reached the critical acclaim that he had hoped. Despite this, Zhou lived a relatively lavish lifestyle, frequently buying perfumes and bringing various boyfriends to his residence.

== Crimes ==
On the evening of 22 June 2006, Zhou arranged to meet a man at a hotel in the Kaifu District. When they met, he drugged the man with sedatives, then stole 600 yuan and his mobile phone. Four days later, the man found Zhou and confronted him, with the two engaging in a scuffle which was broken up by authorities. Zhou was subsequently arrested when the policemen learned that he had robbed the victim, and he was subsequently given a 3-year prison sentence and a 5,000 yuan fine. He was paroled for good behavior in August 2008, but ceased singing altogether.

Around September 2009, Zhou started posting on various BDSM websites, advertising that he was searching for "slaves". His victims of choice were usually men in their 20s or early 30s from the northern regions, most of which were relatively tall. He would usually meet them in hotels or guesthouses around Changsha, where they would choke each other with ropes. In some instances, the victims were asphyxiated by Zhou while other times, Zhou tricked the victims into hanging themselves for Zhou's sexual pleasure by lying about the safety of autoerotic asphyxiation. From 10 October to 26 November, six of Zhou's one-night stands were found hanging in their rooms. The similarity of all the deaths (the way the victim had hanged themselves, being naked, etc.) led authorities to believe that none of them were accidental, and they eventually started an inquiry to resolve what exactly had transpired.

=== Murders ===
The victims, who are referred to by pseudonyms, were all discovered the morning after their deaths:

- Feng Yu (Chinese: 冯宇), from Gansu, 10 October 2009: Feng was Zhou's ex-boyfriend and his first BDSM partner. They broke up after Zhou discovered Feng was HIV positive, which was the motive behind his murder
- A man surnamed Fang (方), from Hubei, 22 October: Fang was killed for upsetting Zhou by asking for payment immediately upon meeting
- A man in his 30s, 3 November: The man was the first of the victims to have been killed at a guesthouse in another location
- A man in his 40s, 15 November: The man was again killed at the usual guesthouse
- Li Jian (李建), from Henan, and Zhang Xian (张贤), from Heilongjiang, 28 November: Both men were separately found dead on the same night at different hotels

Police identified Zhou after the widow of the final victim, Li Jian, demanded that police investigate a connection to the death of Zhang Xian due to their similarities and close proximities. Officers discovered that the same pseudonym had been used to rent the two hotel rooms. A physical description by a receptionist led to the arrest of Zhou shortly after. A phone call at Zhou's home during the arrest showed that he had arranged for another meeting with a man from Heilongjiang, who had just then arrived in Changsha and was subsequently told of the development by police. On 18 April 2010, two other men , from Heilongjiang and Beijing, came forwards to the press, stating they had met with Zhou in early November and survived after refusing to let themselves be hanged.

== Arrest, trial, and imprisonment ==
After several days of investigation, the authorities arrested Zhou on 28 November and charged him with six counts of murder. In the interrogations, he confessed to participating in the so-called "hanging game", but claimed that he did not partake in it himself - instead, he simply watched as the victims choked themselves to death and simply left.

Zhou was eventually convicted of the six deaths and sentenced to death by the Changsha Intermediate People's Court on 29 March 2011. He appealed the sentence on the grounds that the victims had hanged themselves voluntarily, and he was thus not directly responsible for their deaths. The Hunan Higher Provincial People's Court were unable to convict him for four of the deaths due to insufficient evidence, but reaffirmed the convictions in two of the cases. The Supreme People's Court upheld the verdicts, finalizing Zhou's death sentence and depriving him of his political rights for life.

== Execution ==
On 29 August 2014, Chinese state media reported that Zhou Youping had been executed in Changsha; the method of execution was not specified.

== See also ==
- List of serial killers in China
