= Li Shikang =

Chinese serial killer (born 1955)

- Born: Li Shikang; 1955 (age 70–71); Sichuan, China

Details
- Victims: 6 killed, 17 wounded
- Span of crimes: February – October 1999
- Country: China
- States: Guangdong; Guangzhou; Sichuan
- Date apprehended: December 1999

Li Shikang (born 1955) is a Chinese serial killer who killed six people and wounded 17 others with letter bombs sent to medical staff in 1999, whom he blamed for not curing his sexually transmitted disease.

== Background ==
The South China Morning Post reported that Li caught the disease from prostitutes, although the illness was not specified, and that his three sons were also ill. Worried about his sons, Li sought medical help for them in 1997. When they got worse, Li blamed the doctors for not fulfilling their duties and decided to mail the letter bombs. However, a report by The Guardian indicated that Li's sons were not infected by their father's illness.

== Crimes ==
Li, frustrated by the fact that doctors had dismissed his fears for his children while failing to cure him, sent his first bomb on February 18, 1999, disguised as a fruit box, to the house of Dr. Xu, teacher of the University of Medicine of Sichuan.

On October 6, 1999, he sent a bomb to Dr. Chen; it exploded and killed Chen and two others at a clinic in Guangzhou. Two others were wounded.

In the third explosion on October 24, 1999, he sent a bomb to Dr. Wu, who told Li that the disease could not be transmitted by everyday contact with his children. Two butlers were killed in the explosion, while Wu and 13 other people were wounded.

== Arrest ==
Li was arrested alongside his brother-in-law Chen Deshun in December 1999 after a joint operation by police in Zhuhai and Guangzhou through the detonators he used.

== See also ==
- List of serial killers in China
