= Shen Changyin and Shen Changping =

Chinese serial killer duo

- 沈长银 沈长平
- Born: Shen Changyin; January 26, 1976; Shen Changping; March 8, 1983; China
- Died: Shen Changyin; April 27, 2006 (aged 30); China; Shen Changping; April 27, 2006 (aged 23); China
- Status: Executed by lethal injection
- Conviction: Murder (11 counts)
- Penalty: Death

Details
- Victims: 11
- Span of crimes: 1999–2004
- Country: China
- States: Henan; Gansu; Shanxi; Anhui; Inner Mongolia; Hebei
- Date apprehended: August 2004

The brothers Shen Changyin (沈长银, January 26, 1975 – April 27, 2006) and Shen Changping (沈长平, March 8, 1983 – April 27, 2006) were Chinese serial killers and cannibals who murdered and ate the livers of 11 prostitutes between June 2003 and August 2004. They were aided by Li Chunling and three other female accomplices.

== Murders ==
In June 2003, the Shen brothers began murdering prostitutes in Lanzhou, Gansu, China. Their first victim was Yao Fang, whom they lured to a house and tied up. After forcing her to provide her bank account PIN, they strangled and dismembered her.

In late November 2003, the Shens robbed Li Chunling in the same manner as Yao; however, they decided against killing her when she offered to bring them more victims. When Li brought them a woman several days later, the brothers robbed her then forced Li to kill her. Then they removed her kidney, burned her body with sulphuric acid, and flushed it down the toilet. The victim was a prostitute.

After murdering three more women in this manner, the Shens and Li moved to Taiyuan, Shanxi, in April 2004. There they lured Zhao Meiying and forced her to bring a prostitute to their home. The Shens then forced Zhao to stab the woman and put the body in a meat processor before flushing the chemical-dipped pieces down the toilet.

After Zhao surrendered to police and Li was caught, the Shens continued to murder women in Hefei, Baotou, and Shijiazhuang.

== Arrest and sentencing ==
In August 2004, the Shens and an accomplice, Du Surong, were caught in a Shijiazhuang apartment while trying to douse the dismembered body of a victim with acid. The Shens confessed to robbing and killing 11 women. They had plotted the murders after they lost money when their Lanzhou auto parts business failed. Shen Changyin also confessed to murdering a man in their hometown of Nanwu, Henan, in 1999, after which the brothers fled in 2000.

The Shens and Li were sentenced to death in September 2005. Three other female accomplices were sentenced to three to 20 years in prison.

The Shens and Li were all executed by lethal injection on April 27, 2006.

== See also ==
- List of serial killers in China
- List of serial killers by number of victims
