= Cheng Ruilong =

Chinese serial killer (1973–2010)

- 成瑞龙
- Cheng after his arrest
- Born: January 1973; Lianzhou, Guangdong, China
- Died: 2 November 2010 (aged 37); Foshan, Guangdong, China
- Cause of death: Execution by lethal injection
- Other name: Zhou Quan
- Convictions: Murder x11 Robbery x1
- Penalty: Death (murders); 7 years (robbery)

Details
- Victims: 11–13
- Span of crimes: 1996–2005
- Country: China
- States: Guangdong; Guangxi; Hunan; Zhejiang; Chongqing; Jiangxi
- Date apprehended: January 2005

Cheng Ruilong (Chinese: 成瑞龙; pinyin: Chéng Ruìlóng; January 1973 – 2 November 2010) was a Chinese robber, rapist, and serial killer responsible for 11 to 13 murders committed in several cities in central, eastern, and southern China between 1996 and 2005. After being caught for robbery and sentenced to serve 7 years under a false name, his real identity would be revealed and he was convicted, sentenced to death and subsequently executed in 2010.

== Biography ==
Cheng was born in January 1973 in Lianzhou, Guangdong, and at the time of his killings, was married, had one child and was unemployed.

His first crime occurred in the Guicheng Subdistrict of Foshan on 25 May 1996, when he and three other men (Lan Qirong, Cheng Sheng and Cheng Haifang) broke into a private residence. Ruilong, Sheng and Haifang, who all wore silk stockings to cover their faces, went upstairs to fetch loot, while Qirong acted as a lookout. When Wu Mou and his family returned home, they were threatened by the gang, who demanded that he give them more than 33,000 yuan in cash and valuable items. After being given the required sum, the gang kept the Mou family hostage until the next day, when Qirong and Ruilong extorted Wu Mou for an additional 178,000 yuan, which he withdrew from his bank account, before fleeing. By that time, police had been alerted about the hostage situation, which resulted in the arrest of Cheng Sheng, while Cheng Haifang fled to his native town, where he was subsequently killed by law enforcement.

In order to avoid arrest, Cheng went on the run but continued to commit crimes, sometimes with accomplices. From 1996 to January 2005, he boasted about killing 13 people across Guangdong, Guangxi, Hunan, Zhejiang, Chongqing and Jiangxi, whom he also robbed and raped. For one murder, committed in May 1998, he was designated as a wanted fugitive by the Ministry of Public Security and was actively sought after by authorities. In the process, three policemen and one security agent were killed.

In January 2005, while operating under the alias of "Zhou Quan", he was arrested for robbery in Ganzhou and sentenced to 7 years imprisonment, which he served at the Jiangxi Men's Prison. He remained there until May 2009, when his true identity was revealed and he was immediately extradited back to Foshan to face murder and robbery charges there. During the subsequent investigations into his crimes and at trial, he readily confessed and pleaded guilty to all charges, but since authorities were unable to locate two of his purported 13 victims, he was charged with 11 counts of murder. Cheng would be convicted of murder in the first instance, which he claimed was factually incorrect, and applied for an appeal.

Throughout his second trial, his remarks and attitude during the proceedings caused outrage, as he claimed that he could not resist killing people and appeared disinterested, occasionally yawning and smiling at the cameras. When his death sentence was confirmed, Cheng remained emotionless and instead looked around the gallery for his family, who were not present.

On 2 November 2010, Cheng Ruilong was bussed in together with several other death row inmates to the execution site in Foshan. In the early morning, he was executed via lethal injection. According to a prison official, he left behind numerous letters written to his family, including a "suicide" letter to his son, claiming that he wanted his son to never learn that he was a murderer.

== See also ==
- List of people executed by lethal injection
- List of serial killers in China
