= Gong Runbo =

Chinese serial killer

- 宫润伯
- Born: 6 July 1973; China
- Died: 31 December 2006 (aged 33); China
- Cause of death: Execution by shooting
- Conviction: Murder
- Penalty: Death

Details
- Victims: 6–28+
- Span of crimes: March 2005 – February 2006
- Country: China
- Date apprehended: 28 February 2006

Gong Runbo (simplified Chinese: 宫润伯; traditional Chinese: 宮潤伯; pinyin: Gōng Rùnbó; 6 July 1973 – 31 December 2006) was a Chinese serial killer who, between March 2005 and February 2006, murdered at least six children between the ages of 9 and 16. Forensic evidence led police to believe he may have possibly killed 28 or more.

Gong was imprisoned in October 1996 for the rape of a 15-year-old girl. He was released in 2004 after serving an eight-year sentence. He sexually assaulted and murdered six children in the city of Jiamusi, in northeast China's Heilongjiang Province. He also molested five others aged 12 and 13. His victims were lured from streets or Internet cafés to his rented apartment.

Gong was arrested on 28 February 2006, when a boy escaped from his apartment and called the police. The police captured Gong in a nearby Internet café and found four decomposing bodies and children's clothes in his apartment. He was executed on 31 December 2006.

== See also ==
- List of serial killers in China
- List of serial killers by number of victims
