= Zhou Kehua =

Chinese criminal

- 周克华
- 2005 mug shot of Zhou used in wanted posters
- Born: 6 February 1970; Ertang, Chongqing, China
- Died: 14 August 2012 (aged 42); Tongjiaqiao, Chongqing, China
- Cause of death: Shot dead by police
- Other names: Baotouge (Chinese: 爆头哥; lit. 'Mr. Headshot' or 'Brother Headshot')
- Motive: Robbery

Details
- Span of crimes: 2004–2012
- States: Jiangsu; Hunan; Chongqing
- Killed: 3–10
- Injured: 5
- Weapon: Firearms
- Date apprehended: 1993, 1997, and 2005 (on charges of arms trafficking and illegal possession of firearms)

Zhou Kehua (simplified Chinese: 周克华; traditional Chinese: 周克華; pinyin: Zhōu Kèhuá; 6 February 1970 – 14 August 2012) was a Chinese arms trafficker and suspected serial killer, believed to be responsible for the Su-Xiang-Yu serial murders (Chinese: 苏湘渝系列持枪杀人抢劫案; lit. 'Jiangsu-Hunan-Chongqing series of murders and armed robberies'). He is thought to have murdered and robbed at least 10 people across China from 2004 to 2012, and was classified as an A-level wanted criminal by the Ministry of Public Security until he was killed in a police shootout.

== Early life ==
Zhou was born on 6 February 1970 in Ertang Village, part of Jingkou Town in Shapingba District, Chongqing. His parents were considered introverts by other Ertang residents as they kept to themselves, living under impoverished circumstances in an elevated, secluded part of the village. Zhou's father was assigned to Ertang's Pingshan production team as an accountant from his original hometown, reportedly as a form of exile due to "poor lifestyle practices", while his mother was a recent divorcee who already had two children. The family had no other relatives in the area and shunned contact with other villagers, never attending marriages or funerals.

Despite his parents' reputation, Zhou was regarded as an honest child, if lacking manners, and affectionately called "Hua'er" ("华儿"), which stuck as a nickname into adulthood. He spent most of his childhood outside because his parents frequently argued over finances at home, usually hanging out at the Jialing River with his best friend Chen Qihong. The boys spent long times swimming and holding their breaths underwater, also fishing for crabs, which they then ate raw on the riverbank, contributing to Zhou's lasting interest in wilderness survival.

Zhou attended elementary and middle school in Ertang, gaining an interest in detective novels and martial arts books, which he rented from the village bookstore. He developed a fascination with firearms, also making an unsuccessful attempt at learning hand-to-hand combat. Zhou failed his entry exam for high school in 1985 and remained unemployed for a year before joining his father's side-business of collecting river sand for a 20 yuan daily salary.

=== First offences ===
In March 1986, at the age of 16, Zhou was jailed for 14 days on molestation charges. In September 1991, Zhou stole 120 yuan in cash, coupons for 50 kilos of grain, and a double-barreled hunting rifle, his first gun, from a private residence in Jingkou Town. Sometime after, he attempted to join the People's Liberation Army, but failed the physical fitness exam. In March 1993, Zhou was travelling through Wuhan and found in possession of the previously stolen rifle during a police inspection in Jiang'an District. He refused to hand over the gun and fired a single gunshot into the ground before fleeing. Zhou was arrested the same day and convicted of violent obstruction of public service, receiving a two-year sentence of re-education through labor at a facility in Hannan District. He was released one month early for good behaviour on 20 February 1995 and gained employment as a porter and forklift operator at the freight container bay of Chongqing East railway station. He was well-liked by colleagues, who remembered his calmness during poker games, though noting his insistent habit of squatting in a corner by himself during lunch.

In 1996, Zhou met and married his wife, referred to by the pseudonym "Xu Rong" in later accounts. In 1997, he was arrested again after purchasing an illegal Type 54 pistol in Wenshan Prefecture, Yunnan, close to the China–Myanmar border, but was released after paying a fine. Due to this and the increasing social isolation of the couple, his in-laws initially distrusted Zhou. The pair moved from their original home and opened a minibus service in 2000, with Zhou as the driver and "Xu" as the ticket seller. However, in late 2001, the bus was involved in a traffic collision in which Zhou's wife and several passengers were injured. The accident was found to be the result of overloading, leading to the minibus being impounded and Zhou being ordered to pay the passengers' medical expenses and compensation. During the 2002 Chinese New Year, Zhou tried to divorce Xu, but upon her refusal, he ran away from home, reportedly moving to Burma. He sometimes visited his wife, but their contact lessened over the years. According to police investigators in Changsha, Zhou had been a mercenary soldier in Burma from 2002 to 2004.

In 2005, he was jailed again for arms trafficking, and sentenced to 3 years in prison in Yunnan.

== Su-Xiang-Yu serial murders ==
Zhou Kehua is suspected to have killed ten people and robbed millions of yuan in Jiangsu, Hunan, and Chongqing between 2004 and 2012.

Police in Jiangsu, Hunan, and Chongqing have linked Zhou Kehua to the following cases:

- Jiangbei, Chongqing, 22 April 2004: Two women were shot after withdrawing money from a bank in Jiangbei. One was injured and the other, identified as 42-year-old Zhao Zheng, was killed. The assailant stole ¥70,000 RMB in cash from the pair.
- Shapingba, Chongqing, 16 May 2005: A couple (Note: Name(s) withheld) were shot, killed, and had their wallets stolen after withdrawing money from a bank in Shapingba. A passing witness was also shot and injured.
- Jiulongpo, Chongqing, 19 March 2009: Han Junliang, an 18-year-old on-duty soldier stationed in Jiulongpo was shot and killed, and the rifle he was carrying was stolen.
- Tianxin, Changsha, 14 October 2009: 56-year-old Li Chengshou was shot and killed while walking through Nanjiao Park in Tianxin.
- Tianxin, Changsha, 4 December 2009: A man, identified as Guo Chaoyun, was shot and killed after exiting a bank on Furong South Road in Tianxin. The assailant stole ¥45,000 RMB in cash from his body.
- Yuhua, Changsha, 25 October 2010: A manager at the Hunan Huancheng Trade Company building in Yuhua was shot, killed, and robbed of his laptop.
- Tianxin, Changsha, 28 June 2011: A 48-year-old man was shot in the waist and head while exiting his car in Tianxin. Though injured, the victim survived.
- Xiaguan, Nanjing, 6 January 2012: Two men were shot after withdrawing money from the Dongmen Street Branch of the Agricultural Bank of China in Xiaguan. One was injured and the other, identified as 42-year-old Cheng Shengyi, was killed.
- Shapingba, Chongqing, 10 August 2012: At 9:37 am, three people were shot in front of the Bank of China Savings Office in Kangjuyuan, Shapingba. Two were injured and the third, identified as Liao Deying, was killed. The assailant, identified as Zhou Kehua, stole ¥70,000 RMB in cash from the deceased and fled the scene. Later in the day, around 1:00 pm, Zhou shot and killed police officer Zhu Yanchao near Qinjiagang Town. A large-scale manhunt for Zhou ensued across Chongqing in response to the murders.

== Death ==
On the morning of 14 August 2012, after a 4-day long manhunt, Zhou tracked to Tongjiaqiao Village, part of Qinjiagang Subdistrict, only a few kilometres from his native village. Police purposely staged a search effort at nearby Gele mountain while sending four police officers to find Zhou and apprehend him. Zhou was spotted at around 6:40, with two plainclothed officers, Wang Xiaoyu and Zhou Jin, who were posted at a post office, following Zhou. After ten minutes, he walked into Lettuce Trench, a dead-end alley, where he turned around and fired three shots at the officers, all of which missed. The two policemen returned fire, fatally wounding Zhou Kehua in the head and stomach with two rounds from a distance of three metres. He died at the scene, his last words reportedly being "I took the wrong path" ("走错了").

== In media ==
- A Touch of Sin, a 2013 anthology thriller film written and directed by Jia Zhangke, features a character loosely based on Zhou Kehua.
- We Are Criminal Police, a 2022 C-drama film features a character directly inspired by Zhou Kehua, named "Zhang Kehan"

== See also ==
- Wang Zongfang and Wang Zongwei - robbers and serial killers considered China's first "most wanted" criminals
- List of serial killers in China
- List of serial killers by number of victims
