= Jia Jianhu =

Chinese serial killer

- 贾建虎
- Born: 1970; Xinzhou, China
- Died: December 27, 2004 (aged 33–34); Taiyuan, China
- Cause of death: Execution by shooting
- Convictions: Murder x12 Robbery
- Penalty: Death

Details
- Victims: 12
- Span of crimes: 1998–2003
- Country: China
- States: Shanxi; Heilongjiang; Jilin; Sichuan; Hubei; Hunan
- Date apprehended: March 29, 2003

Jia Jianhu (Chinese: 贾建虎; 1970 – December 27, 2004) was a Chinese serial killer who killed twelve prostitutes across six provinces in China from 1998 to 2003, out of a desire to take "revenge" on society. He was subsequently convicted of these crimes, sentenced to death and executed in 2004.

== Background ==
Born in Xinzhou in 1970, Jia Jianhu was the son of a seemingly ordinary couple who often worked in neighboring provinces. In contrast to his parents, Jia proved to be an undisciplined child who often refused to interact with his peers, and when he got older, he quit school altogether and spent most of his time at home. As he was not keen on studying or working any kind of labor-intensive job, he lived in squalor, as his parents were too busy working to provide him with material support.

Growing tired of poverty, Jia decided to begin stealing in 1988 but was quickly caught after burglarizing an apartment and given a 2-year prison term. The news of his arrest caused his parents to lose their confidence in him, leading to them barely contacting him at all. After his release, Jia lived on the streets and survived by stealing before he was caught again in 1991 and given a 7-year prison term. While in prison, his psyche gradually warped and he developed a feeling that society had wronged him, for which he wanted to take revenge once he got out. After he was released in 1996, Jia began to study police procedure and investigative methods through television programs and books, honing his knowledge for approximately two years. Once he felt he was ready, Jia decided that he would take revenge by hunting and killing prostitutes.

== Murders ==
Jia committed his first murder on July 15, 1998, when he entered a beauty salon in Taiyuan operated by a masseuse named Sun. He then approached the woman and killed her, stealing approximately 200 yuan. Following this, he began to travel from province to province, targeting itinerant prostitutes between the ages of 21 and 40. His modus operandi involved raping his victim before either strangling them with his hands or a rope, or alternatively cutting their throat with a knife, before finally stealing any valuables he found on them. From 1998 to 2003, Jia killed eleven victims in the aforementioned manners, with his killing locations being the cities of Taiyuan and Yuncheng in his native Shanxi, with others killed in the provinces of Heilongjiang, Jilin, Sichuan, Hubei, and Hunan.

On March 28, 2003, he killed his twelfth victim, a prostitute named Wang Dongxiang, in Taiyuan, stealing her mobile phone, gold jewelry and some yuan. After identifying the victim, district police quickly connected her killing to that of prostitute Chen Mou, who had been killed only thirteen days prior. Upon interrogating witnesses around the Wanbailin District, some claimed that they had seen a man who had accompanied the two women shortly before their deaths, and stated that he lived around Baijiazhuang. After investigating the residents of the area, both permanent and temporary, authorities eventually zeroed in on Jia, an unemployed ex-con who had recently returned to Shanxi not too long ago. Upon gathering enough evidence to charge him with the murder, police recovered the murder weapon in his house.

== Execution ==
Shortly after his arrest, Jia confessed to the two murders, claiming that he had used their services before ultimately killing them. To the shock of the investigators, he additionally claimed responsibility for ten more homicides dating back to 1998, providing accurate details about the respective crime scenes. He was subsequently convicted and sentenced to death for the murders by the Taiyuan Intermediate Court. On December 27, 2004, he was executed by shooting at an undisclosed prison in Taiyuan, along with eight other criminals convicted for unrelated crimes.

== See also ==
- List of serial killers in China
