= Li Yijiang =

Chinese serial killer

- 李义江
- 2001 mug shot
- Born: 1980; Changji, Xinjiang, China
- Died: August 20, 2004 (aged 23–24); China
- Status: Executed by shooting
- Conviction: Murder
- Penalty: Death

Details
- Victims: 7
- Span of crimes: 1994; 2002 – 2003
- Country: China

Li Yijiang (Chinese: 李义江; born 1980 in Changji, Xinjiang – August 20, 2004), also known as Li Wenjiang (李文江), was a Chinese serial killer who killed seven people.

== Background ==
Hailing from Changji, Li was admitted to the Beijing Institute of Technology in 1999, majoring in computer science. In the next semester, he began to work part-time. In the second year of his sophomore year, he dropped out of school and was arrested in 2003. He was executed on August 20, 2004.

Li committed his first murder when he was 14. He committed his next crime in 2002. In that year, he was raped by four men and decided to kill them for revenge, killing two others as well. Li's murder method was to cut off the victim's sexual organs. Expert analysis showed that he wasn't cared for during his childhood, and so he went down the murderous path.

== Youth ==
Since childhood, he was raised by grandmother in Beijing, and one day he was sent back to his parents in Xinjiang. His mother had been diagnosed with a mental illness, which made her lose her temper, beat Li at home. During this time, he was scared to be around his mother. After he began to attend high school, his mother's condition was stabilized, but his father began drinking alcohol excessively. Despite Li complaining about this, he was not beaten, but on several occasions his father picked up a kitchen knife and threatened his son.

== See also ==
- List of serial killers in China
