= Li Pingping =

Executed Chinese serial killer

- 李平苹
- Born: 1960; Anhui, China
- Died: 15 June 2004 (aged 43–44); Beijing, China
- Cause of death: Execution by shooting
- Convictions: Murder x7 Arson; Theft
- Penalty: Death (murder)

Details
- Victims: 7
- Span of crimes: 1995; 2002 – 2003
- Country: China
- State: Beijing
- Date apprehended: 2003

Li Pingping (Chinese: 李平苹; 1960 – 15 June 2004) was a Chinese serial killer who murdered four women between November 2002 and April 2003. He was aided in the disposal of the bodies by his wife Dong Meirong. After his arrest, Li also confessed to the murder of a family of three and an arson attack in 1995.

Li was sentenced to death and executed in 2004 while Dong received a 15-year prison sentence.

== Early life ==
Li was born in 1960 in Anhui. At age three, he and his parents moved to Hongmen village in Haidian, Beijing, to live with relatives in a house with a dilapitated courtyard, surrounded by barren land and a trash-polluted canal. At school, Li was ostracised and mocked by classmates for his family's poverty and the stench of his clothes. In one incident, Li punched one of his bullies and after school, several of his schoolmates kidnapped him, covering his face with a bag and dragging him to the canal, where the other boys beat Li before throwing his clothes in the river.

Li was described as an introverted and withdrawn man who rarely communicated with others, seemingly had no friends or hobbies, and immediately went home to sleep after finishing his shift.

== Crimes ==
In May 1980, Li was convicted of hooliganism and sexual harassment, for which he was sentenced to one year of probation. In December 1985, he was convicted of theft, serving a six-month prison term.

=== 1995 ===
In 1995, Li was employed as a boiler worker for Beijing's Gaotian Health Food Company, but fired for violations of the work discipline code and slacking. In April 1995, he went to Xiangshan Subdistrict, breaking into a house, owned by Wan Baoming. Li set fire to the empty house, destroying all nine of its rooms and the property within, causing ¥57,000 in damages.

In May 1995, Li broke into the house of his former manager, 40-year-old Song Shutian, killing Song, his wife, and his 12-year-old daughter with a knife. In order to cover up his tracks, he set fire to the house, burning it down to the ground. Before fleeing, he stole two rings and a tape recorder, worth around ¥2,560.

=== 2002–2003 ===
By 2002, Li was living in a siheyuan-type courtyard house in Haidian with his wife and young son. Because his wife was unemployed, Li was the main provider for his family, including his elderly parents. Li was employed as a taxi driver for the Wanquansi Taxi Company, one of Beijing's largest transport companies. Between November 2002 and April 2003, he parked in front of karaoke clubs, where he picked up prostitutes with whom he would negotiate a price for sexual services in advance. He would then drive his victims to his house, where he stabbed them to death with a fruit knife. In this manner, he killed four prostitutes, extensively mutilating the latter three victims. After he was done, he and his wife, Dong Meirong, would transport the corpses to a nearby garbage dump, where they discard them and leave.

== Sentence and execution ==
In 2003, Li and his wife were arrested by the authorities. In the investigation that followed, Li, in a calm manner, directed the officers to the garbage dumps, where they dug up the prostitutes' remains. Later on, during an interrogation with detectives, Li claimed that he had wanted to kill the victims because he was jealous that they made more money than him. The No. 1 Intermediate Court in Beijing found Li guilty of seven murders, arson, and theft, receiving the death sentence for his crimes. His wife, for her participation in disposing of the corpses, was sentenced to 15 years imprisonment.

On 15 June 2004, Li Pingping was executed in Beijing's execution grounds with a single gunshot to the head, aged 44. His execution was covered in a Radio Free Asia interview with a staff member at the Shandong Psychological Counseling Center, where Li had been ordered to undergo an examination before trial. According to the staff member, Li showed signs for mental illness, which the staff member attributed to China's rapid social changes, but these were left undisclosed until after his death.

== See also ==
- List of serial killers in China
