= Hua Ruizhuo =

Executed Chinese serial killer

- 华瑞茁
- Born: 1973; Shuangcheng City, Heilongjiang, China (present-day Harbin, China)
- Died: January 31, 2002 (aged 28–29); Beijing, China
- Cause of death: Execution by shooting
- Conviction: Murder x14
- Penalty: Death

Details
- Victims: 14
- Span of crimes: 1998–2001
- Country: China
- State: Beijing
- Date apprehended: July 26, 2001

Hua Ruizhuo (Chinese: 华瑞茁; 1973 – January 31, 2002) was a Chinese serial killer responsible for the murders of 14 prostitutes in Beijing's Chaoyang District between 1998 and 2001. He would subsequently be executed for these crimes in 2002.

== Early life ==
Hua Ruizhuo was born in 1973 in Shuangcheng, Heilongjiang, growing up in the province's countryside. In 1993, he moved to Beijing and overtook his retired father's job as the driver of a concrete mixing transport truck. He was described as a diligent and friendly worker by colleagues, who dutifully carried out his work using his white Samsung truck imported from South Korea.

In 1994, Hua fell in love with a girl named Qiu Yan, with whom he began a romantic relationship. After the couple dated for seven or eight months, during which they separated and got back together on multiple occasions, Hua was dispatched to deliver something from work near a big hotel. When he left the truck, he saw that his girlfriend was making out with an older male in front of the hotel. Much to his shock, he learned that Qiu secretly worked as a prostitute. After he had finished work, he unsuccessfully tried to convince the woman to leave prostitution behind and marry him, but Qiu refused on the grounds that she wanted to choose her own lifestyle, breaking up with him on the spot.

Over the next few years, while trying to get over his former girlfriend, Hua slowly began to develop a hatred towards prostitutes and a desire to take revenge on any woman who partook in this trade. In 1999, he married a woman from Sichuan, with whom he would have a son.

== Murders ==
Hua Ruizhuo would pick up prostitutes in his company truck near the Yansha bridge, between 1 or 2 o'clock in the morning, and negotiated a price which usually was around 200 yuan. After they entered his truck, he usually traveled to their homes, where the two would have sex. After that, he would then beat or strangle them, either using his bare hands or anything he could get his hands on, before hitting them on the head with stones or hammers. After killing his victims, he would then dispose of the bodies in various manners, usually by either burying, throwing them in a septic tank or a well. According to some news reports, some of the victims had items such as corn stalks or steel rods inserted into their vaginas. Hua was particularly meticulous in concealing any evidence that might lead back to him, avoiding any police patrols and discarding any of his victims' possessions that might incriminate him.

In total, between 1998 and June 2001, Hua is known to have killed fourteen women, only twelve were conclusively identified:

- July–August 1998: the highly decomposed and ossified body of an unidentified victim was found in a cornfield near Juzifang, Dongba Township on September 21, 1998. Hua claimed that he had picked her up on the way back from the Yansha bridge, and that she had worn lots of make-up. Allegedly, he began seeing his girlfriend's face when he looked at her, and told her that he was going to strangle her. The woman didn't take him seriously at first, but Hua then choked her into unconsciousness and drove her to the cornfield. When she woke up, he continued choking her until he made sure that she was dead.
- July 31, 1999: the body of 22-year-old Wu Mei (or Wang Juan) was found at a rental apartment in Maizidian.
- September 4, 2000: the body of an unidentified woman was found in a cornfield outside of the Chaoyang District.
- December 19, 2000: the naked body of an unidentified woman was found in a well in Dongba Township.
- April 12, 2001: the body of an unidentified woman was found in a garbage dump on the northeast side of Kangjingli by an elderly local villager. Her head had been smashed in, and her neck had been tied with a wire.
- May 14, 2001: the body of an unidentified naked woman was found in a chemical toilet belonging to a nearby construction company.
- April–June 2001: the highly decomposed body of an unidentified woman was found on a mound near Pingfang Township, with toilet paper shoved down her throat and her mouth taped with scotch tape; not long after, police found the bodies of three unidentified women thrown down a well near a nursery in Juzifang. All four victims were discovered on July 11, with the latter three being found hours after the first victim.
- June 24, 2001: the body of 33-year-old Xiao Wen (or Liang Juan) was found by her brother-in-law on the bed in her apartment, covered with blankets. According to Hua, he killed her after learning she had a venereal disease.

== Investigation, arrest and trial ==
Following the murder of Xiao Wen, authorities started asking other prostitutes whether they had seen entering a client's car on the night of her disappearance. A woman surnamed Wu told them a driver of a cement mixing truck, who often frequented the area, was the last man Xiao was seen with. Using this information, police started investigating all truck drivers matching the man's description, but the break came when they found and examined Xiao's phone: her call records indicates lots of calls from a phone number which was traced back to the Dingfuzhuang mixing station. When they went to inspect any employees matching the description, they came across Hua Ruizhuo, who was revealed to be the owner of the phone. He was arrested and brought to the police station; in the meantime, his house was also searched, with officers finding a plastic bag containing more than 20 eyebrow pencils used for make-up. After a few hours, Hua confessed that he had killed the prostitutes, saying to the officers that he considered them to be "dirty" and deserved to be killed. When pressed further, he revealed that he never managed to recover from the break-up with his first girlfriend, and that his resentment eventually led him to taking it on prostitutes who resembled her. When it came to his unidentified victims, Hua could only recall vague things that had made an impression on him: for example, that the eighth victim had the longest hair and that he stole her Sony phone, which he gave to his wife; the ninth one being the tallest; the eleventh having the shortest hair; another being the fattest, and yet another sounding like she had a Russian accent. Following his confesison, Hua was quickly brought to trial, convicted on all charges by the Beijing Intermediate People's Court and sentenced to death.

== Execution ==
On January 31, 2002, Hua Ruizhuo, together with several other violent offenders, was executed in Beijing. His lawyer had attempted to unsuccessfully appeal his client's sentence on the grounds that Hua had killed them in blind rage, but this request was rejected.

== See also ==
- List of serial killers in China

== Bibliography ==
- Peter Vronsky (October 5, 2004). Serial Killers: The Method and Madness of Monsters. Penguin Press. ISBN 1101204621.
