= Chen Yongfeng =

Chinese serial killer

- 陈勇锋
- Chen on the day of his execution in 2004
- Born: 1983; Qingtian County, Zhejiang, China
- Died: April 7, 2004 (aged 20–21); China
- Cause of death: Execution
- Other name: "The Butcher"
- Penalty: Death

Details
- Victims: 10
- Span of crimes: February – May 2003
- Country: China
- State: Wenzhou
- Date apprehended: May 24, 2003

Chen Yongfeng (Chinese: 陈勇锋; 1983 – April 7, 2004), also known as The Butcher, was a Chinese serial killer who was responsible for killing and dismembering ten people whom he lured to his home in Wenzhou in 2003. He was sentenced to death and executed in 2004.

== Biography ==
=== Early life ===
The exact date of birth is not clear, but Chen was born sometime in 1983 in Qingtian County, Zhejiang. He left school after graduating from elementary school, afterwards he started to shuffle around odd jobs, including fluffing cotton for nearly half a decade. However, by the age of 19, he appeared to have found work as a garbage collector.

=== Murders ===
Beginning on February 24, 2003, Chen began his killing spree. His first murder occurred when he wanted to buy a disinfection cabinet but had not enough cash. He would find his victims at trash collecting sites he frequently visited for work, and invite them to his home where he would kill them, succeeding this he robbed their corpses of money and jewelry, then dismembered them and discarded the remains in a river. He was arrested on May 24, after being caught in the act of dismembering his tenth and final murder victim. In a subsequent house search, police found that Chen had stolen a total of 10,032 yuan.

=== Trial ===
The trial of Chen Yongfeng was opened by the Wenzhou Intermediate People's Court later that year, with him half admitting his guilt. At the same time, there was a civil trial for Chen, was being told to pay the funeral expenses to the relatives of his victims. In the end, the verdict was guilty, and Chen was sentenced to death on December 5, 2003. On April 7, 2004, Chen was executed.

== See also ==
- List of serial killers in China
- List of serial killers by number of victims
