= Li Guangjun =

Convicted Chinese serial killer on death row

- 李广均
- Born: December 8, 1969 (age 56); Wanglou Village, Jiangsu Province, China
- Convictions: Murder x7 Rape x8 Robbery x7
- Penalty: Death

Details
- Victims: 7
- Span of crimes: February – November 2006
- Country: China
- States: Hunan; Gansu; Shaanxi; Henan
- Date apprehended: November 5, 2006

Li Guangjun (Chinese: 李广均; born December 8, 1969) is a Chinese serial killer and rapist who killed seven women between February and November 2006 in Hunan, Gansu, Shaanxi, and Henan provinces, accessing all the crime scenes via the China National Highway 310. Due to the brutal nature of his crimes, he was sentenced to death and is still awaiting execution.

== Early life ==
Li Guangjun was born on December 8, 1969, in Wanglou Village, Fanlou Town, in Feng County, Jiangsu, the son of poor farmers who earned his living as a butcher. At 17 years of age, he moved to Northeast China, where he married a woman in Hunan, with whom he had a son. After five years of marriage, he expressed his wish that they return with him back to Jiangsu, but his wife refused, remaining in Hunan. Guangjun travelled back alone, and when he returned, he married another woman, Zhong Meixue. Ten days after their marriage, Li's first wife, her sister-in-law, and their children suddenly arrived at his doorstep, but after learning he had moved on behind their back, both of them left him, never to return. Guangjun and Meixue began living together, leading a normal life for eight years, during which the couple had two children.

In October 2000, Li Guangjun was arrested for raping his wife's neighbor, for which he was given 7 years imprisonment. He was released on probation in August 2005 and returned to Jiangsu, only to learn that his wife had left him for another man, returning to her native Hunan and giving birth to two more children. Li Guangjun himself tried to unsuccessfully convince her to reconcile with him, but Zhong's family categorically refused. Infuriated, Li planned to kill his wife but was only stopped by his daughter, who pleaded that he change his mind. Moved by his daughter's actions, he spared Meixue but still planned to enact revenge on her by killing somebody else from the family.

== Victims ==
Li raped and murdered the following people:

- Sun Caixia
- Wang Saifang
- Jia Lijuan
- He Mou
- He Dongrui
- Ma Yanshuang

In addition, Li attempted to murder Niu Zhancong and Wu Guihong.

== Murders ==
On February 9, 2006, at around 12:30 AM, after he was unable to get in contact with his wife, Li went to her sister, Meiyue, who lived in Sangzhi County, to ask for help. Unexpectedly for him, the woman began hurling verbal abuse at him, angering him to the point that he grabbed a nearby knife and stabbed her several times, killing her on the spot. Realizing that he'd be considered the prime suspect in the murder, Guangjun grabbed a map outlining the country's geography and planned to go to Xinjiang via the China National Highway 310. Carrying only 20 kilograms of water and a box of instant noodles, he traversed the Gobi Desert, alternating between walking and using a bicycle, and attempted to cross over the border to Mongolia on multiple occasions, but the tight border control prevented him from doing so.

During these months, Guangjun's anger from his wife's perceived infidelity gradually grew into a hatred towards women as a whole, with him deciding that he would take his revenge by killing women above 30 years of age. To do so, he rode a bicycle back to Hunan, and from there, he set off to various locations accessible via the China National Highway 310, sleeping in abandoned houses and by the roadside at night, as he had no money to pay for motels.

Spanning from September 24 to November 5, Guangjun carried out a total of eight attacks, killing six women and injuring two others. The incidents were recorded as follows:

- September 24, 2006: rape and stabbing murder of Sun Caixia in Sizha Village, Zhangye, in Gansu. He stole a Hongqi bicycle worth 226 yuan from the victim.
- October 10, 2006: rape and murder of Wang Saifang in Kushui Town, Yongdeng County, in Gansu. She was beaten to death with a brick.
- October 12, 2006: attempted murder of Wu Guihong in Gancaodian Town, Yuzhong County, in Gansu. She was passing by the area when she was hit on the head with a brick, but despite her serious injuries, she survived the attack.
- October 17, 2006: rape and murder of Jia Lijuan in Pingtou Town, Baoji, in Shaanxi. Guangjun hit her head with a stone while she was being raped, killing her on the spot.
- October 24, 2006: rape and murder of He Mou in Yangdian Town, Lingbao City, in Henan. Mou had been passing by the area when she was hit on the head with a brick and strangled afterwards. Guangjun stole her Nokia 2300, worth 430 yuan, as well as her phone charger.
- October 26, 2006: attempted murder and robbery of Niu Zhancong in Yanshi District, Luoyang, in Henan. The pair were seen struggling near the Luohe Bridge, whereupon Guangjun pushed the woman away, stealing 221 yuan and her Nokia 1100.
- October 27, 2006: rape and murder of He Dongrui in Huiguo Town, Gongyi, in Henan. While en route to work, she was hit on the head with a beer bottle and then stabbed in the neck. While she was bleeding out, Guangjun dragged her to a nearby culvert, where he proceeded to rape her. After finishing with the victim, he stole 100 yuan in cash and her Haier V200 phone, worth 634 yuan.
- November 5, 2006: murder of Ma Yanshuang in Quxing, Henan. After passing a toll gate on the Nichinan Expressway, Guangjun attacked Ma with a pair of scissors, slitting her throat and killing her on the spot. He then stole her Siemens C65 phone, worth 634 yuan, and fled the spot.

== Arrest ==
Three hours after killing his final victim, Li Guangjun was arrested by police in Kaifeng, who had been tracking his crime spree since the murder in Lingbao City, where the body had been found by a villager picking apples from his orchard. During interrogations, he confessed to all of the recent attacks, murders, and rapes, blaming it all on his failed marriage and his wife's infidelity. On October 20, 2007, Li Guangjun was found guilty on all counts by the Intermediate People's Court and sentenced to death, as well as being deprived of political rights for the rest of his life.

== Status ==
As of 2021, Guangjun is still on death row in Henan. In 2008, he gave an interview to a state media outlet, in which he claimed that he didn't consider himself a murderer and that he had killed some of the victims because they were being unfaithful to their husbands. In said interview, he confirmed that he had dropped all of his appeals and welcomed the death penalty, stating that his only regret was that he couldn't see his son.

== See also ==
- List of serial killers in China
