= Song Jinghua =

Executed Chinese serial killer

- 宋京華
- Song during an interview
- Born: 1979; Inner Mongolia, China
- Died: May 27, 2011 (aged 31–32); Beijing, China
- Cause of death: Execution by shooting
- Conviction: Murder x9
- Penalty: Death

Details
- Victims: 9
- Span of crimes: 1996–2007
- Country: China
- State: Beijing

Song Jinghua (Chinese: 宋京華; 1979 – May 27, 2011) was a Chinese serial killer who murdered and dismembered nine women in Beijing between 2005 and 2007. He was subsequently executed for his crimes in 2011.

== Biography ==
=== 1996 murder ===
Song was born in 1979 in Inner Mongolia and lived with his father and older brother. In 1996, Song and his brother agreed to rob and kill a taxi driver that had failed to pay the pair protection money just outside Gongti.

The day after the crime took place, both Song and his brother were arrested. Song noticed his brother's ex-girlfriend testifying on behalf of the prosecution as a witness at trial, making him believe she turned them in. His brother was sentenced to death and subsequently executed months later, while Song, then 17 years old, was given an eight-year prison term. After six years, Song was granted early release in 2002.

=== Murders (2005–2007) ===
Upon his release, Song decided to exact revenge on his brother's ex but could not locate her. Who he did locate was Yan Jinguang, who would later assist him in the murders. His murder spree began in 2005. Later, according to his own testimony, he killed women that shared a similarity with the ex, luring them in his car where he and Yan would strangle and steal money from the women. To help with the murders, the pair rented a living center in the Pinggu District to dismember the bodies. The victims ranged in age from 16 to 28.

In 2007, Song killed his neighbor upon fearing she was onto them after allegedly spotting him concealing a human head. At the crime scene, Song left a cigarette, ultimately leading to his arrest. According to himself, he left it there intentionally because he knew he was not going to stop. In his confession, he explained the whole story, claiming that the women whom he had slain were the result of his anger towards his brother's ex. Yan too was soon arrested, and after their convictions, they were both given corresponding execution dates. On May 27, 2011, both were executed.

== See also ==
- List of serial killers in China
- List of serial killers by number of victims
