= Zhou Wen =

Chinese serial killer

- 周文
- Born: 1965; Anshan, Liaoning, China
- Died: 13 January 2004 (aged 39); China
- Cause of death: Execution by shooting
- Other name: "Anshan Taxi Devil"
- Conviction: Murder (6 counts)
- Penalty: Death

Details
- Victims: 6
- Span of crimes: June – July 2003
- Country: China
- State: Liaoning
- Date apprehended: 28 November 2003

Zhou Wen (Chinese: 周文; 1965 – 13 January 2004), known as the Anshan Taxi Devil (Chinese: 鞍山出租车恶魔), was a Chinese serial killer who killed six women in 2003, while he worked as a taxi driver in the city of Anshan. It is believed his killing spree was motivated by his wife's abortion.

== Murders ==
Upon getting out of jail for an unrelated crime, Zhou got a job as a taxi driver for the commuters in the city of Anshan in central-southeast Liaoning province. In the summer of 2003, while on the job, Zhou starting his killing spree, strangling female passengers with a rope who had willingly gotten into his taxi, before dumping their bodies in enclosed open ground areas or roadside water wells. Once all the bodies had been located, a moral panic sparked among locals, who resorted to other defaults to avoid the killer, temporarily affecting the transport business.

== Arrest, trial and execution ==
On 28 November, Zhou was detained at his home by authorities and subsequently confessed after little questioning. In his confession, he detailed that he hated women following his wife's abortion, which reportedly was without his permission. It was found that Zhou had also written a diary which detailed the murders of all six women.

Zhou was found guilty of robbery and murder. He was sentenced to death on 30 December and was executed on 13 January 2004. In an interview conducted the day before his execution, Zhou stated he had "no remorse" for his victims.

== See also ==
- List of serial killers in China
- List of serial killers by number of victims
