= Wu Jun =

Chinese politician

- 吴军

Vice-Mayor of Guiyang
- In office April 2013 – September 2014

Personal details
- Born: May 1972 (age 54) Guizhou, China
- Party: Chinese Communist Party
- Education: Guizhou University of Technology; Northern Illinois University; Huazhong University of Science and Technology

Chinese name
- Traditional Chinese: 吳軍
- Simplified Chinese: 吴军
Transcriptions
Standard Mandarin
- Hanyu Pinyin: Wú Jūn

Wu Jun (born May 1972) is a Chinese politician from Guizhou province. As of June 2014 he was under investigation by the Communist Party's anti-corruption agency. Previously he served as the Vice-Mayor of Guiyang.

== Life and career ==
Wu was born and raised in Guizhou province. He graduated from Guizhou University of Technology in July 1996. He also studied at Northern Illinois University between December 2007 to June 2008. In March 2012, he entered Huazhong University of Science and Technology, majoring in western economics.

In April 2013, he was appointed the Vice-Mayor of Guiyang, capital of Guizhou province, he remained in that position until September 2014, when he was removed from office by the Organization Department of the Chinese Communist Party.

On June 9, 2014, he was being investigated by the Central Commission for Discipline Inspection of the Chinese Communist Party for "serious violations of laws and regulations". On November 14, 2014, he has been placed on file for further investigation.

== See also ==
- Wu Jun (disambiguation)
