= Zhang Yongming =

Chinese serial killer

- 张永明
- Born: 1956; Jinning County, Yunnan, China
- Died: 10 January 2013 (aged 57); Yunnan, China
- Other names: The Cannibal Killer; Cannibal Monster
- Convictions: Intentional homicide Cannibalism
- Penalty: Death

Details
- Victims: 12+
- Span of crimes: 1978; May 2007 – April 2012
- Country: China
- State: Yunnan
- Date apprehended: 9 May 2012

Zhang Yongming (Chinese: 张永明; 1956 – 10 January 2013) was a Chinese serial killer and cannibal who was convicted of, and subsequently confessed to, the murder of 11 people between March 2008 and April 2012, in what became known as the Jinning serial murder case. He was executed on 10 January 2013.

The case received domestic significant media attention because Zhang had been frequently reported since the first murder, but local authorities failed to investigate. Parents of the missing were the ones to make the disappearances public as the "Bizarre Serial Disappearance Case" ("离奇连环失踪案"). Internationally, media focused on Zhang's claims of selling the flesh of the victims as "ostrich meat" to the public.

== Early life and first offences ==
Zhang was a native of Nanmen village, part of Jinning, Kunming. In 1974, at age 18, Zhang attempted to kill his 16-year-old cousin and schoolmate Lu Turong during a sleepover at the Zhang residence. The two had been sleeping in the same bed when Lu awoke at around 4:00 a.m. after Zhang stabbed him in the neck with a kitchen knife. Lu blocked the knife with his hand when it came down again and screamed to alert Zhang's parents, who disarmed their son. Lu survived with eight stab wounds to the neck. Zhang was sentenced to prison, but released after serving six months, based on the explanation that the crime was committed while Zhang was sleepwalking. Lu later stated that the two had previously been on good terms and that there was no prior conflict between him and Zhang.

In 1978, Zhang killed 16-year-old Yang Shurong, with whom he had been paired to burn bricks at the kiln and sell rice for the village's production team. With the promise of 18 yuan, Zhang lured Yang into his home, where he strangled the boy to death. Yang's undressed body was found in a freshly dug hole outside of Nanmen, curled into a fetal position after his limbs were broken. Zhang subsequently fled to neighbouring Chengjiang County, where he was arrested after a half-month investigation identified him as the murderer. In 1979, Jinning Court found Zhang guilty and imposed a death sentence with a two-year reprieve, but for unknown reasons, the sentence was commuted to imprisonment. Zhang was released in September 1997, after serving 19 years. During this time, his parents died, his older siblings moved away and the family home was destroyed when it collapsed in on itself.

Zhang was repatriated to Nanmen, where village authorities provided Zhang with some farm land and a dibao, a minimum living guarantee for rural residents. Zhang was initially known to tend the fields every day to grow vegetables, but he subsequently neglected the land, causing it to become barren. He instead supported himself through odd jobs, growing increasingly reclusive over the following ten years, remaining isolated since villagers disliked him on account of the previous murder. Zhang remained unmarried, and was rarely seen away from his property, only going out to play go in the local park. In 2011, Zhang had a stomach hemorrhage and crawled to the house of a village administrator across the street to get help.

== Serial murders ==
On 1 May 2007, Li Hanxiong disappeared on his birthday after going near Zhang's home. The boy had accompanied his father Li Yudong to help till their land, when the elder Li, worried that his son might overheat in the hot weather, sent his son home early at 9:30 a.m. to prepare rice for lunch. Li Hanxiong told his father that he was going to take a detour to retrieve a lost piece of clothing at a nearby field. It's assumed by authorities that Li Hanxiong was abducted while crossing a riverbank next to Zhang's house while walking to the aforementioned field. Finding that his son was not home, Li Yudong searched the village for any trace of Li Hanxiong, alerting Jincheng Police Station at 17:00 in the afternoon. Officers told him that he should come back when 24 hours had passed, reasoning that the boy might have just gone to an internet café. On 2 May, Li Yudong learnt from fellow villager Li Guiying (no relation) that he and some neighbours had seen Zhang Yongming pace the riverbank 30 minutes after Li Hanxiong disppeared. Li Yudong reported this to the police in Jincheng, but they did not investigate the claim.

In 2008, Fenghuangshan resident Yang Minggui was on his way home from school when Zhang accosted him and brought the boy to help him carry timber at his house. While Yang squatted down to grab the wood, Zhang pulled a rope around his neck and began strangling him. Yang broke free, escaped, and told his parents about the incident, but they did not call authorities, arguing that Yang wasn't seriously injured. By this point, villagers had begun to suspect Zhang of being involved in the disappearance of Li Hanxiong, but most decided not to report their suspicions to police. On 27 January 2011, Xie Haijun went missing after heading for junior high school to pick up an exam. His father calling Jincheng deputy police director Tian Chun and accused Zhang Yongming of committing the crime. A week later, Tian called Xie's father back and told him that they weren't going to investigate Zhang because he was determined to be mentally ill. Many of the parents came to believe that the children were kidnapped to work at brick kiln factories, spending several thousand yuan during searches.

On 1 December 2011, 17-year-old Xiao Zhang (a pseudonym) finished up a late evening study session at the middle school library and began walking back to his house 200 metres away. Zhang Yongming was walking ahead of Xiao Zhang. Feeling uneasy, Xiao Zhang jogged past Zhang, but 20 metres away from his house, Zhang tried to slip a belt around Xiao Zhang's neck. The boy dodged, with Zhang instead wrapping the belt around Xiao Zhang's arm to drag him away. Xiao Zhang repeatedly struck the older man in the head and waist with his remaining hand, choosing not to scream for fear of angering Zhang into escalating the violence. After getting dragged five metres, Xiao Zhang called out to a neighbour emerging from a house. Zhang relented from his attempt and turned to flee, but Xiao Zhang held onto his clothes as the neighbour rushed forwards, allowing the latter to pin Zhang to the ground. Xiao Zhang's mother then called police, who arrived ten minutes later. Zhang told police he had only "played a prank" on the child, which the officers didn't believe, but he was released after paying 30 yuan for Xiao Zhang's medical treatment.

=== Final murder and arrest ===
On the evening of 25 April 2012, Han Yao, a student at Yunnan University of Technology and Business, disappeared while doing construction work in Nanmen. Han had been tasked with fetching some documents from an office 20 minutes away by his foreman Guo Naiqiang. At the office, Han stuck around longer and spoke with his friend Xian Qiwei, who invited Han to stay and browse the internet. Han declined, but he took Xian's identification card to access the computer later, leaving the office at 9:10. To make up for the lost time, Han exited the building through the back to take a shortcut down a secluded road, largely concealed by trees and debris. Guo called his subordinate's phone at 10:00 a.m., but found that the device had been switched off. Guo didn't think much of it until the work day had ended, when Han could also not be located at the dormitory. At 22:00, Guo asked Han's friend Li Chaoxiong to call Han's mother, Cheng Lianyan.

Cheng first disregarded Han Yao's absence, as he was already gone from home for nearly two weeks for employment, but became worried when daughter Han Na was also unable to reach him. The following morning, when Cheng found out through Li that her son was still missing, she went to Jincheng police station. Although 24 hours had passed, the officers said that Han probably just met someone online or got in a fight. Cheng travelled to Nanmen to look for her son with a photo and was quickly told about the disappearance of other young men in the area. Cheng asked police about this, but they dismissed the village's concerns as rumours. The following day, together with a Nanmen resident, Cheng tried again at a second police station in Jinzhen town, where they were also rebuffed, with one officer asking "What evidence do you have that they're missing?". In response to this, Cheng started an investigation of her own, meeting with the parents of four of the missing youths to collect and summarise the details about the disappearances. Within two days, Cheng established that all disappearances occurred between 9:00 and 11:00 in the morning at the Nanmen Ditch, in direct vicinity of farmer Zhang Yongming's home and fields. All but Han Yao had disappeared at the nearby Xinyun Cold Storage. Disillusioned with the police, Cheng sent the evidence to local media in Kunming, who prominently reported on the case on 3 May. The same day, Kunming Public Security Bureau formed a special task force to investigate the disappearances.

On 7 May 2012, Zhang Yongming was arrested at his home. A search of the house found the recently dismembered body of Han Yao, along with several of his belonging including his phone, SIM card, and bank cards. At Zhang's house and in his fields, the human remains of about ten people were recovered buried beneath the soil. Residents of Nanmen stated they had seen plastic bags hanging from his home with what appeared to be broken bones protruding from them. Upon entering his home, police reported discovering human eyeballs preserved in bottles and what appeared to be human flesh drying. It was further alleged that Zhang fed his dogs flesh from some of his victims as well as selling it at the local market, calling it "ostrich meat". The Ministry of Public Security took over the investigation, which was completed on 27 May.

=== Victims ===
Between 2007 and 2012, police confirmed the murder of eleven people, all of them male. With the exception of two older men, all victims were between 12 and 22. Not counting the 1978 case, Zhang was accused of up to 17 murders, which was the number of total disappearances within Nanmen since Zhang's release from prison.

- 1978: Yang Shurong (杨树荣), 16
- 2007: Li Hanxiong (李汉雄), 12
- 2010: A 38-year-old man
- 2011: An 80-year-old man and six teenagers, including Zhang Haijun (张海俊), 16, Cai Yunwei (蔡云伟), 17, and Chen Tao (陈涛), 16
- 2012: Han Yao (韩耀), 20

== Aftermath ==
During his trial, it was reported that Zhang refused to apologize for the killings and did not show any remorse. He was executed on 10 January 2013.

Twelve police officers were penalized for dereliction of duty regarding the murders, including Da Qiming, Jinning police chief, and Zhao Huiyun, head of the Jincheng Township police station, who were both dismissed from office. The police defended their actions by claiming that the disappearances weren't as high of a priority as the local drug abuse at the time.

== See also ==
- Eight Immortals Restaurant murders
- List of incidents of cannibalism
- List of serial killers in China
- List of serial killers by number of victims
