= Li Wenxiang =

Chinese serial killer

- 李文香
- Born: 1952; Meixian, Guangdong, China
- Died: December 1996 or thereafter
- Other name: Guangzhou Ripper
- Occupation: Migrant construction worker
- Convictions: Murder, rape, robbery
- Penalty: Death sentence

Details
- Victims: 13
- Span of crimes: 1991–1996
- Country: China
- Location: Guangzhou

Li Wenxiang (Chinese: 李文香; pinyin: Lǐ Wénxiāng; 1952 – after 1996), sometimes mistransliterated Li Wenxian and also known as the Guangzhou Ripper, was a Chinese serial killer who was active between 1991 and 1996 in Guangzhou, China. He killed 13 women and was sentenced to death.

== Victims ==
Li murdered 13 women, including a woman surnamed Wang (王某). Li also attacked a woman surnamed Xie (谢某).

== Murder case ==
Li's first victim was found 22 February 1991, a woman in her early twenties. She had been mutilated; her genital region had been removed after the sexual assault took place. Li struck 5 more times over the next 6 months, typically following a similar method, with the bodies typically being left amongst the voluminous trash heaps overflowing in the city's "floating" district. Many of these residents were impoverished, and Li's victims were exclusively sex workers.

The attacks abruptly stopped; given China's policy of downplaying such crimes, the matter was thought to have resolved itself, until another victim's corpse washed ashore in the then-British colony of Hong Kong. The South China Morning Post reported that the victim had to have buoyed from the mainland, as no corresponding missing persons reports had been filed. The victim had been slit nearly her entire body length, and then sewn together again, with fingers severed. The head of Guangzhou's provincial Criminal Investigation Department said: "In all my thirty years with the force, I have never come across anything like this. Perhaps he copied from the West."

The murders continued, sometimes with the use of a hammer, until in November 1996, when Li inadvertently left a victim alive. She identified Li, whom she knew to be a migrated ex-farmer who had joined a local construction crew. Li quickly confessed, stating his motivation as antipathy towards sex workers, as one had allegedly scammed him soon after his arrival in the city. The Intermediate People's Court found him guilty on all counts and sentenced him to death on 18 December 1996.

== See also ==
- List of serial killers in China
