= Wang Wanming =

Chinese serial killer and rapist (1957–1999)

- 王万明
- Born: 26 February 1957; Manshoushan, Gaizhou, Liaoning, China
- Died: 1999 (aged 41–42); Xi'an, Shaanxi, China
- Cause of death: Execution by shooting
- Convictions: Murder ×20; Rape ×52
- Penalty: Death (murders); 24 years (rape)

Details
- Victims: 20
- Span of crimes: 1992–1998
- Country: China
- State: Shaanxi
- Date apprehended: 13 December 1998

Wang Wanming (Chinese: 王万明; 26 February 1957 – 1999) was a Chinese serial killer and rapist who was the principal offender in a series of rape-murders committed in Shaanxi province during the 1990s, at the same time when another two, completely unrelated criminals were also active. Upon his arrest, Wang confessed responsibility for 52 rapes and 20 murders, for which he was subsequently tried, convicted, sentenced to death and executed.

== Early life and crimes ==
An ethnic Manchu, Wang Wanming was born on 26 February 1957 in Manshoushan, a small village within Gaizhou, Liaoning. Early on in childhood, he gained a reputation for being combative and for ignoring his studies, eventually dropping out of elementary school after the third grade. During his time at school, there were rumors that he studied alongside Wu Jianchen, who would also become a serial rapist and killer later on in life, but this was never conclusively verified. As a teenager, Wang gained notoriety amongst his villagers for molesting local women.

In November 1981, Wang was arrested for raping a woman in Gaizhou and sentenced to five years imprisonment, but was paroled for good behavior. Not long after, he committed another rape and was arrested yet again, this time receiving a harsher sentence of 19 years. In 1986, he was transferred to a laogai hospital in Tieling to undergo treatment for tuberculosis, but while he was left unattended, he used a hacksaw to saw off the steel bars of his room's windows and successfully escaped. He remained in hiding until 1991, when he settled in his older brother's house in Yanliang District, Xi'an, where he was soon hired to tend to local orchards. Wang then permanently settled in Xi'an, where he lived with his common-law wife Sun Xiaocui and their son.

== Murders ==
On 2 June 1992, the body of 18-year-old Wang Yingying was found in Yuhua, in Xi'an's Yanta District. An autopsy showed that she had been raped and subsequently bludgeoned to death by her assailant, but no clues led to the killer's identity. From 1993 to 1994, seven similar cases were recorded all around the area, resulting in five further deaths, and from 1995 to 1996, another six incidents were recorded with a further three deaths. At the time, they were all considered unrelated and thus treated separately, but despite the investigators' best efforts, they were unable to crack any of them.

On 8 April 1997, the highly decomposed corpse of 18-year-old Jia Xioani was found in a wheat field approximately 100 meters east of Shangbei Village. A noticeable peculiarity in this case was that her killer had burned Jia's pubic hair before he stole her bicycle and fled. The case immediately attracted the attention of the Xi'an Municipal Bureau, which quickly formed a special task force to quickly resolve the case, but due to the degradation of the body, they were unable to extract any valuable evidence. Using conventional police methods, the officers made a profile of the offender, surmizing that he was in the age range between 18 and 45, may have been imprisoned before and likely a job that allowed him to attack only at certain hours. Therefore, the investigation's scope centered around the crime scene and the surrounding villages, but again, months passed without any progress.

While the task force focused on Jia's murder, two additional killings were recorded in Taiping Village and Nanfeng Village. The killings occurred on 15 December 1997, and 13 February 1998, respectively. After investigating the crime scenes, the authorities concluded that the murders were linked and were likely committed by a local, leading to an increase in screening procedures amongst the male populace. While this was going on, a further eight cases occurred in various villages around Yanta District from 28 February to 24 November 1998. The increase in the attacks attracted the attention of the Shaanxi Provincial Public Security Department, whose directors ordered that further investigations be conducted, including those of possibly related unsolved cases. From this, the investigators linked the rapes and murders from around the area dating back to 1992 to the recent ones, combining them all into one.

== Investigation and arrest ==
After the merging of the cases, authorities initially came to the conclusion that they were likely committed by one perpetrator who had the following traits: he acted alone, was an older male, likely not native to Shaanxi and had a big beard. Because of this, a separate task force was organized to solve the crimes centering around the villages of Guoshe, Xiliu and Zhucun, since the majority of crimes occurred there.

Eventually, the first break in the case when the task force identified Song Ganping, a migrant worker at a kiln farm, as the prime suspect. Soon afterwards, he was arrested in Xunyang on 13 November 1998, but to their surprise, they could only link him to six rapes. Not long after, a local submitted a tip in which he accused another man, Zhang Yuping, of being the killer. Zhang was arrested shortly afterwards, initially for robbing a taxi driver, and while he confessed to one of the murders and two rapes later on, he claimed to be innocent when it came to the other crimes. Stumped by this occurrence, some investigators began to doubt whether the conclusions they had come to were correct, before finally settling on the idea that there was a third, unrelated perpetrator still on the loose.

On 13 December 1998, Shi Yaru, a woman who had recently been attacked by an unknown assailant in Xi'an, reported to police that she recognized her attacker on the street, leading to his immediate arrest. Initially, the man refused to divulge his identity, and while investigators were questioning him, police officers were dispatched to his house in order to search it. Inside, they found stolen goods belonging to some of the victims, ranging from bicycles to clothes and leather bags. After several days of questioning the suspect, he finally confessed that his name was Wang Wanming and he was responsible for the unsolved rapes and murders, with his guilt further reinforced after his DNA was linked to the crime scenes.

== Trial, imprisonment, and execution ==
Following Wang's confession, authorities made a statistic of all the crimes that had occurred in Shaanxi from 1992 to 1998, concluding that from the 60 rapes and 21 murders, Wang was responsible for 52 of the rapes and 20 of the murders. Zhang and Song were charged with the remaining crimes, and were judged separately from one another.

Wang was subsequently tried, convicted and sentenced to death for all the aforementioned crimes, with his execution taking place on an unspecified date the following year. On the day of his execution, a crowd of approximately 10,000 to 20,000 gathered outside the execution site, whereupon some of the victims' family members attempted to bypass the guards and beat Wang to death. When they were prevented from doing so, they instead started throwing bricks. Regardless of this, the proceedings continued and Wang was shot without any further incidents. Following the execution, some of the victims' family members thanked the investigators who had solved the case, and even sent gifts to the members of the security organs for their efforts.

== See also ==
- List of serial killers in China
- List of serial rapists
