= Qian Yongchang =

Chinese serial killer (1936–1995)

- 钱永昌
- Born: 1936; Banqiao Town, Shilin Yi Autonomous County, Yunnan, China
- Died: 1995 (aged 58–59); Yunnan, China
- Cause of death: Execution by shooting
- Other name: Qian Guan
- Conviction: Murder x15
- Penalty: Death

Details
- Victims: 15
- Span of crimes: 1959–1995
- Country: China
- States: Yunnan; Guangxi; Guizhou
- Date apprehended: 27 October 1995

Qian Yongchang (Chinese: 钱永昌; 1936–1995) was a Chinese serial killer who killed 15 people from 1959 to 1995 across three provinces, out of a self-professed contempt for how society had treated him. At the time of his arrest, Qian's advanced age led to him being labeled the country's oldest active serial killer, as well as one of the longest active, with his killing spree lasting more than three decades and a half. For his last crimes, he was convicted, sentenced to death and executed.

== Early life ==
Qian Yongchan was born in 1936, in Banqiao Town, Shilin Yi Autonomous County. The only child of poor farmers, he dropped out of school early as he had no interest in studying and instead started working odd jobs to support his family. During this time, he also began committing petty thefts. In 1958, he was hired to work as a laborer in the construction of the Guikun Railway in Xuanwei, and while working there, he was regarded positively by his colleagues. Owing to his eloquent speech and easygoing personality, Qian attracted the attention of several women, including the wife of the contractor, with whom he began an affair.

== Murders ==
=== First murder and early crimes ===
Qian's affair with the contractor's wife continued up until October 1959, when the pair were accidentally found out by a co-worker of his. Fearing that the man would reveal their inappropriate relationship, Qian asked the man to follow him, ostensibly under the pretense to bribe him into silence. The pair went to the edge of a nearby cliff, where Qian pushed the co-worker off and let him fall into the abyss. He then returned to his mistress and openly admitted to what he had just done, and while she did not tell anybody else what had happened, the pair ended their liaison by mutual agreement. When it came to the other workers, while some questioned what had happened to the man, most of them just brushed it off as him deciding to leave of his own accord, which was considered normal in this line of work.

After this incident, Qian experienced a drastic shift in personality, becoming more irritable and quickly resorting to fistfights to solve his problems. In 1960, he was sentenced to a year in prison for assaulting another man, which he spent at the detention center in Kunming. After his release, with no income or desire to work honestly, he resorted to stealing and robbing people. Because of this, Qian was arrested for theft in 1962 and sent to a labor camp in Kunming, where he spent a year doing labor-intensive work. He continued stealing even after his latest release and was repeatedly incarcerated from 1964 to 1967, with his latest arrest landing him in another labor camp, where he remained until 1973.

=== 1974–1994 ===
After being released from prison yet again, Qian stopped with the thefts, but after a few months, he decided to engage in robberies instead. In August 1974, he was in Liuzhou, Guangxi, when he confronted a merchant who was passing by. After stealing the man's money, Qian killed him and quickly fled to avoid capture. The following month, he robbed and killed a merchant who was selling mushrooms in Guiyang, Guizhou. While he managed to avoid arrest in either of these cases, Qian would nevertheless be arrested on charges of being a counter-revolutionary and interned at the Ludong Coal Mine in Qujing, where he would remain from 1974 to 1983. Shortly before his scheduled release, he escaped and remained a fugitive for a short time before being arrested for fraud and imprisoned the following year. He was then sent to the Ying Coal Mine, where he was interned until 2 January 1994. Upon his release, he returned to his hometown.

=== Final crimes ===
Once he returned to Shilin Yi, the now 58-year-old Qian decided it would be impractical to continue with the robberies because of his old age, but as he had no practical skills and was unwilling to work, he instead resorted to stealing whatever he could and then selling it. As time passed, the money he got became less and less, leading Qian to grow restless. This only worsened once he started paying attention to other people of his age, all of whom had children and even grandchildren, leaving him to feel alone and jealous of their happy lives. Because of this, this eventually led him to the decision that he would take out his anger on his robbery victims, which usually ended with deadly consequences.

From May to August 1994, Qian robbed and killed three migrants workers in Kunming and Hechi. His modus operandi was to stake out cheap hotels where poor migrants workers usually lived, and once he selected his victim, he would break into their room while they were asleep and repeatedly bludgeon them with a hammer, before finally stealing all of their savings. Because of the lack of surveillance and the myriad of people who lived in these establishments, most of whom had no ID cards, it was difficult to solve the cases. From January until 27 October 1995, Qian attacked ten additional victims, nine of whom died, while the last one was left in a vegetative state.

== Arrest, trial, and execution ==
After a rigorous investigation by the authorities, they were eventually given some details regarding their suspect: according to witness testimonies, he was supposedly surnamed Qian, had served time in labor camps under the name "Qian Guan", appeared to be in his 50s and had a distinctive mole under his nose. Utilizing this description, the investigators distributed the description to the staff of all major hotels, guesthouses and similar establishments in the Yunnan and Guangxi areas.

Eventually, the investigators received a tip from a hotel attendant on 27 October, in which the man claimed to have seen Qian boarding a minibus bound from Luxi City to Qujing. A team of police officers was dispatched to intercept the vehicle, resulting in the swift of arrest and extradition of Qian to the nearest police station. During the subsequent interrogation, when he was pressed for a motive, he stated that he wanted to take revenge on the society which he claimed had failed him, saying that he was alone in this world, as well as the fact that never wanted to go back to jail ever again.

Due to the severity of his crimes, Qian was quickly tried, convicted, and sentenced to death. When his verdict was read out in the court, he said that he felt no remorse for what he had done and said the following: "I killed people everywhere just to be shot. I don't care at all." Soon after, Qian would be executed, but his exact date of execution is unknown.

== See also ==
- List of serial killers in China
