= Li Zhanguo =

Chinese serial killer and rapist (1969–1995)

- 李占国
- Born: 1969; Dabaizhuang, Henan, China
- Died: after August 4, 1995; China
- Cause of death: Execution by shooting (presumed)
- Other name: "Gay Murderer of Henan"
- Convictions: Murder ×11; Sodomy ×12
- Penalty: Death

Details
- Victims: 11
- Span of crimes: 1991–1995
- Country: China
- State: Henan
- Date apprehended: August 4, 1995

Li Zhanguo (Chinese: 李占国; 1969 – after August 4, 1995), known as the Gay Murderer of Henan (Chinese: 河南同性恋杀人犯), was a Chinese serial killer and rapist who raped and murdered 11 mentally-ill teenagers and young men in his native Henan, in order to act out his sexual fantasies. He was convicted and sentenced to death for his crimes, and was presumably executed some time after.

== Early life ==
Little is known of Li Zhanguo's life. Born in 1969 in Dabaizhuang, he was the only child of what was described as an ordinary family and was well-respected by the locals. Unbeknownst to them, however, Li was secretly in a relationship with another young man from his village and had developed an addiction to watching pornographic videotapes, which festered an obsession in him to have a relationship with another man. He then attempted to start a relationship on multiple occasions, but was rejected each time, leading to him feeling bitter and lonely, and eventually causing him to resort to violence to satisfy his desires.

== Murders ==
On March 18, 1991, the police station in Xiaoqi Township received a report that a stack of wheat straws was burning in a field in the southern section of Dabaizhuang. Officers and other public security organs were dispatched to the scene to put out the fire, but after they did so, they found the charred, headless corpse of what appeared to be a young man. The man was lying on his back, had been disemboweled and had had his genitalia severed, which was found in a ditch southwest of the field. A search utilizing police dogs later found his head about 24 meters away to the west of the crime scene. The autopsy results indicated that there were cord marks around the neck-flap, and the contents of the man's stomach included vegetable leaves, banana peels, and other food, indicating that he had been murdered fairly recently.

Shortly thereafter, a special task force was organized both to identify the decedent and to capture his killer. As no substantial clues to his identity were found, authorities resorted to publishing notices in major and regional newspapers in Henan and Hubei asking for help from the public, but yet again, nothing useful came out of this endeavor.

On July 14, 1992, the naked body of a man was found in the kang bed-stove of Yu Jian, who lived in Naodian. The corpse was lying prone, with a straw rope tied around his neck and a nylon rope tied around his left wrist. Blood was splattered on the nearby wall, with indications of blunt force trauma to the head. An autopsy confirmed that the decedent had been strangled with a rope and then hit in the head with an adobe brick, which had been left behind at the crime scene. Eventually, a man from nearby Shiying identified the decedent as his younger brother, who was mentally-ill and required supervision from his family members.

Subsequent interviews with witnesses claimed that shortly before the incident, a well-dressed young man was seen in the company of the victim, who was begging for meals and wandered along the border of Baofeng and Jiaxian counties. When asked where he was from, the stranger said that he came from Xiaoqi Township. Upon learning this, authorities immediately moved their base of operations to Xiaoqi Township, with observations being conducted on all male, mentally-ill locals who matched the supposed victim type of the killer.

On July 29, the body of another man was found in an abandoned explosives-storing warehouse, west of the porcelain factory in Yangzhuang Township. Like the previous victims, his naked body was lying prone, was in a state of severe decomposition and had evidently been clobbered to death. On the nearby walls, the words "I am the killer" and "Sacrifice" had been written in blood. When officers questioned the local villagers, they claimed that just three days prior, a neatly dressed young man had accompanied the victim from the Yangzhuan railway station along the highway to the crime scene, beating him with a stick along the way. That same evening, the pair were seen sleeping in a wheat field, and on the following morning, a villager reported seeing the stranger leading the naked victim to the warehouse. Later on, he saw the stranger sitting on the front door steps of the warehouse, but the victim was nowhere in sight.

From the information gathered from the two murders, investigators concluded that they were likely committed by the same perpetrator due to the similarities, and could possibly even be the same killer from the unsolved 1991 cold case. Based on this, the three cases were combined into one and a comprehensive investigative operation was launched. More than 40 key suspects were investigated in Xiaoqi, Yangzhuang and Naodian, but no new evidence was uncovered and the cases were put on hold.

On February 14, 1993, yet another naked body was found in a pond to the southwest of Xiaoqi. Despite being severely decomposed, authorities were able to identify the decedent as another local young man who suffered from dementia. In order to possibly find viable evidence, the police drained the pond for three consecutive days, but to their disappointment, nothing valuable was uncovered. On April 28, another decomposed body was found in a canal in Xiaoqi, followed shortly afterward by yet another corpse on May 5. Both men were found naked, apparently strangled and in a state of severe decomposition, with the analysis of the latter victim's belongings identifying him as a mental patient.

On October 15, another body was found in the canal, with some screws inserted into the hands of the deceased indicating that he was possibly another mental patient. On February 20, 1994, the lower half of a man's body, which sported burn marks on the legs, was found in a canal approximately 600 meters south of Dabaizhuang. After searching the nearby Xigan Canal in Cipaling on the next day, investigators found a headless corpse which also had identical burn marks on the legs.

On August 27, another highly decomposed corpse was found in the Nangan Canal in Jiazhai. The final victim was found on May 24, 1995, in a wheat field near Dabaizhuang. After further investigation, it was found that the last victim suffered from dementia. By this time, the murders were the primary focus of the local police, draining a majority of its manpower as well as material and financial resources, but they were still unable to solve the cases. Fearing even further backlash from the local populace, the chief investigators organized a meeting to outline how to capture the killer, eventually settling on deploying special units to the surrounding townships and keeping watch on all known mentally-ill individuals, as they believed that the killer would likely attempt to strike again.

== Arrest, trial and execution ==
On August 4, 1995, investigator Jia Hongwei was on patrol when he noticed a neatly dressed young man walking alongside another dirty young man, who was known to suffer from dementia. Remembering the description provided in the witness testimonies, he followed the pair, realizing that they were heading towards the road to Xiaoqi. Jia then immediately called his colleague, Kang Yongchao, who had a motorcycle, and the two investigators took a detour and set up an ambush in a cornfield ahead of their targets.

When the two men arrived at the cornfield and the stranger started undressing the young man, the investigators fired a warning shot and moved in to arrest him. To their surprise, the man turned out to be none other than Li Zhanguo, who had been repeatedly listed as a prime suspect in previous murders, but was never arrested due to a lack of strong evidence. Not long after he was brought in for questioning, Li unexpectedly confessed to all the crimes, claiming that he had resorted to violence after being rejected by multiple men. Li was thereafter tried, convicted, and found guilty on all counts, for which he was sentenced to death and deprived of his political rights. He is believed to have been executed sometime afterward, but the exact date is unclear.

== See also ==
- List of serial killers in China
