= Zhang Jun (serial killer) =

Chinese serial killer (1966–2001)

- 张君
- Born: August 5, 1966; Hualin Village, Hunan, China
- Died: May 20, 2001 (aged 34); Chongqing, China
- Cause of death: Execution by shooting
- Convictions: Robbery; Murder; Robbery of firearms and ammunition
- Penalty: Death

Details
- Victims: 28
- Span of crimes: 1993–2000
- Country: China
- States: Chongqing; Hunan; Hubei; Yunnan; Guangxi
- Date apprehended: September 19, 2000

Zhang Jun (Chinese: 张君; pinyin: Zhāng Jūn; August 5, 1966 – May 20, 2001) was a Chinese robber and serial killer. From June 1993 to September 2000, Zhang and his associates robbed a total of 22 stores in Chongqing, Hunan, Hubei, Yunnan and Guangxi, killing 28 people and wounding 23. The total amount stolen was alleged to be 5.36 million yuan.

== Early life ==
Zhang Jun was born on August 5, 1966, in Hualin Village, Changde, Hunan, into a poor family. He was the youngest of seven brothers and sisters. Because of his poor family, he dropped out of school in the first year of high school to participate in social activities. He was arrested in 1989 and sentenced to labor reform.

== Robberies ==
On December 22, 1995, Zhang robbed the Chongqing Friendship store, killing one person and stole gold jewelry worth 455,000 yuan.

On December 25, 1996, Zhang robbed Shanghai's first department store, stealing gold jewelry worth more than 630,000 yuan.

On November 27, 1997, Zhang robbed Changsha Friendship Mall, killing two people and stole gold jewelry worth 1.372 million yuan.

On December 20, 1998, Zhang raided a public security checkpoint and the toll station of the Gong'an County of Hebei Province, killing two people.

On January 4, 1999, Zhang robbed the gold jewelry cabinet of Wuhan Square in Wuhan, killing one person and stealing 30,000 yuan and 2.634 million in gold jewelry.

On August 15, 2000, Zhang robbed the president of the Agricultural Bank of Anxiang County, killing two people and stealing 16,000 yuan.

On September 1 of the same year, Zhang robbed a cash truck in Changde, killing seven people and stealing two small sub-machine guns and 20 bullets.

== Previous crimes ==
In 1993, Zhang Jun and his friend Liu Baogang, who was known to the Shaoguan Institute, went to Anxiang County to commit a robbery. The robbery was not successful and Zhang accidentally injured his companion. In order to avoid capture, he killed Liu with a hammer and disposed of his corpse. After that, he escaped to Guangxi and killed a Hubei businessman before the Spring Festival. At the same time, he met a mistress in Guangxi and using money she gave him, purchased a pistol. After that, he lured two escorts to a mountain where he killed them both in order to practice killing people quickly.

== Arrest ==
The Chongqing police issued an arrest warrant to the investigative team for Zhang Jun on September 19, also arresting one of his mistresses, Quan Hongyan, who came out of the hospital with him. According to reports, Zhang had a military hand grenade with him when he was arrested. Wen Qiang, then deputy director of the Chongqing Municipal Public Security Bureau, personally interrogated Zhang Jun.

== Trial ==
On April 14, 2001, Zhang Jun was sentenced to death by the First Intermediate People's Court of Chongqing for intentional homicide and robbery, and deprived of political rights for life. On May 20, 2001, he was executed in Chongqing.

== Cultural references ==
The 2020 film Caught in Time (除暴) is based on the story of Zhang Jun.

== See also ==
- List of serial killers in China
- List of serial killers by number of victims
