= Hu Daoping =

Chinese criminal and serial killer

- 胡道平
- Born: 1971; Chongqing, China
- Died: April 14, 2006 (aged 34–35); China
- Cause of death: Execution by shooting
- Other name: Wu Jun
- Conviction: Murder
- Penalty: Death

Details
- Victims: 7
- Span of crimes: 2003–2005
- Country: China
- State: Sichuan
- Date apprehended: September 10, 2005

Hu Daoping (Chinese: 胡道平; pinyin: Hú Dàopíng; Wade–Giles: Hu Tao P'ing; 1971 – April 14, 2006), also known by his alias Wu Jun (Chinese: 吳軍), was a Chinese criminal and serial killer who killed seven people during robberies between 2003 and 2005 after escaping from prison. Hu was later sentenced to death and executed by shooting in 2006.

== Biography ==
Hu, originally raised in a poor family from Chongqing, married a woman in 1993 and later fathered a child in 1995. In that same year, he was charged for theft and then sentenced to eight years in prison.

=== Murders ===
Three years into his sentence, Hu escaped prison and fled to Sichuan in June 1998, carrying on his criminal escapades. In May 2000, Hu stole nearly 10,000 yuan from the philatelic store in a Yuechi County Post Office. On December 1, 2003, he robbed a Jintai Jewelry Shop in Yuechi County of more 400,000 yuan, while also murdering the shop owner Fu Jianguo and guard Yang Lin.

On January 13, 2005, Hu entered the Yuechi County post office and attempted to rob the vault, killing two police officers Cheng Zeping and Zhang Yong that were present. In April, he attempted to rob a jewelry store in Guang'an, but the plot failed. On September 6, Hu killed three union guards (including Jiang Weiyang and Zheng Ying) at the White Temple Credit Union. Afterwards he robbed the place of more than 180,000 yuan and fled.

=== Execution ===
Four days later, Hu was arrested by authorities. On December 7, 2005, he was sentenced to death, he was deprived of political rights for life, and all his personal property was confiscated.

Before the verdict, an interview with him was conducted, in which he confessed to everything. On April 14, 2006, Hu was executed.

== Victims ==
Hu killed the following people:

- Cheng Zeping (程泽平), police officer
- Zhang Yong (张勇), police officer
- Fu Jianguo (付建国), burned to death, owner of shop
- Yang Lin (杨林), burned to death, guard of shop
- Jiang Weiyang (蒋维阳), guard
- Zheng Ying (郑英), guard

== Personal life ==
Hu Daoping was married to Zhu Nianqiong (朱埝琼). After Hu Daoping was sentenced to death, Zhu was found guilty of attempting to cover up the crime. Zhu was sentenced to three years in prison with a suspended sentence of four years.

== See also ==
- List of serial killers in China
- List of serial killers by number of victims
