= Duan Guocheng =

Chinese serial killer (1973–2003)

- 段国诚
- Born: 1973; Yueyang, Hunan, China
- Died: 24 April 2003 (aged 29–30); Hubei, China
- Other name: The Red Dress Killer
- Status: Executed
- Conviction: Murder x13
- Penalty: Death

Details
- Victims: 13 killed 14 injured
- Span of crimes: 1999–2001
- Country: China
- States: Hunan, Hubei
- Date apprehended: 15 August 2001

Duan Guocheng (1973 – 24 April 2003) was a Chinese serial killer and robber who murdered 13 women in Hubei and Hunan between 1999 and 2001. Additionally, he committed fourteen assaults and over forty other robberies during the same timeframe. Duan was arrested in 2001 following a three-month manhunt and executed in 2003.

Duan was wanted by police in Yueyang for nine counts of murder and numerous robberies, but had managed to flee to Wuhan, where he resumed his killings and muggings. Based on unfounded rumors that most of the victims in Wuhan wore red clothing, the killings were dubbed "The Red Dress Murders" and the then-unidentified perpetrator was nicknamed "The Red Dress Killer". In official accounts, the later murders are referred to as the Wuhan 5·7 serial robbery-homicide case ("武汉5·7系列抢劫杀人案").

== Early life ==
Duan was born in Yueyanglou, Yueyang. His parents, originally from Jianli, Hubei, were described as honest, but short-tempered. Since early childhood, Duan was known as a pickpocket. When he was seven or eight years old, his father broke one of Duan's fingers with a pair of pliers to prevent him from stealing again. Over time, the relationship between Duan and his parents became strained due to frequent quarrels over "trivial matters", to the point where they no longer ate at the same table.

At age 13, Duan was arrested for theft and sentenced to three years in juvenile detention, later extended by two years for violating rules. He was released at age 18, but imprisoned again the same year to serve five years for robbery. Upon his release at age 25, Duan was initially employed by Xincheng Industrial Company, where his father worked, but he performed poorly and did not make friends with colleagues. Duan was described as having no distinguishing characteristics, with no hobbies or social contacts. He was known as an alcoholic gambler who frequented the service of prostitutes. He lived with his parents and frequently unemployed, last working as a security guard. According to Duan's mother, her son blamed his father for the family's poverty, which Duan believed was also the reason why he could not enter a romantic relationship.

Investigators later assumed that Duan's social isolation during his formative adolescent years either caused or exacerbated a personality disorder.

== Crimes ==
Duan would loiter around an area, carrying a 2,5 cm single-edged knife and a flashlight. When he saw a potential victim, he would sneak after her before ambushing the woman from behind in a dark place, typically a doorway, courtyard, or apartment floor. Duan covered their mouths with one hand while pressing the knife into their backs as a threat to give him over valuables such as money, jewelry, handbags, or mobile phones. Surviving victims stated that Duan dressed in dark clothing, spoke with noticeable mumbling due to an underbite, and had an unpleasant body odor.

=== Yueyang murders and escape ===
The first crimes all took place in various quarters of Yueyanglou, from 4 April 1999 to 16 February 2001, during which time he robbed over forty women, most in their 30s, killing nine and injuring twelve. He also sexually assaulted some of them by biting them in the groin. According to Duan, he had already committed robberies since 1998, initially solely motivated by financial gain. He eventually stabbed and killed a woman who had resisted and shouting for help, stating that the screams of women subsequently elicited emotions of anger and arousal afterwards. He claimed that he only continued initial attacks if the victim kept screaming.

Yueyang's Public Security Bureau offered a ¥200,000 reward for information in Duan's murders. The bureau identified Duan as the perpetrator a day after the final murder on 17 February 2001, when police were able to track the location of the last victim's mobile phone to Duan's residence at his parents' house. Officers informed Duan's parents and waited inside the home for Duan to return from his job. Duan spotted the officers inside through a window and escaped police after a foot chase. Police subsequently broadcast a nationwide all-points bulletin for Duan. It was initially believed that Duan's mother had informed her son of the police's presence, leading to a week-long jail stay before she was released. After narrowly escaping police in Panyu, Guangzhou, Duan temporarily stayed in Jianli, Hubei, where he received ¥300 from relatives. By early May 2001, Duan was hiding in Wuhan, moving between various hotels and guesthouses and using a fake Tongcheng County identification card for the alias "Hu Cheng", which a former fellow inmate had forged for him while in Guangzhou.

=== Wuhan murders ===
Through 7 May to 3 June 2001, Duan committed over twenty robberies, including six in which women were violently attacked, with four being killed. He lingered in back alleys in Wuchang, near the Shouyi, Liangdao, and Ziyang streets, following women to their homes, killing them outside their apartments or in nearby courtyards.

==== Attacks ====
- 7 May, 12:40 a.m., Huazhong village: a 24-year-old student was robbed of her wallet and keys. She was killed in the courtyard of a dormitory for the Hubei Institute of Fine Arts
- 9 May, 1:30 a.m., Liangdao street: a woman in her 20s was robbed of ¥2,000 and cornered in an alley at knifepoint. She was sustained a stab wound to the hand while fending off the attack before two passersby interrupted and caused the assailant to flee
- 25 May, 1:30 a.m., Liangdao street: a woman was stabbed and had her bag stolen in a run-by snatch theft
- 1 June, 12:20 a.m., Ziyang street: 41-year-old Wang Guiyu was bludgeoned from behind with a brick while on her way home. She managed to run to her apartment complex before being stabbed to death. As her screams had alerted neighbors, who witnessed the murder from their windows, the assailant fled without stealing anything
- 2 June, 3:15 a.m., Liangdao street: a 20-year-old woman, surnamed Chen, was ambushed while in the stairway outside of her apartment. She resisted heavily before dying from 38 stab wounds
- 3 June, 2:15 a.m., Qiyi street: a migrant worker in her 20s was robbed outside her apartment complex. She was dragged to a nearby courtyard, raped, and killed

Although some English-language accounts describe the victims as all being young women in their 20s walking alone, they were actually aged 20 to 41. Most of them were migrant workers or university students not native to the province. A popular rumor claimed that the fatal victims all wore red and had long hair, leading some women to stop wearing red clothing, usually opting for blue colors, and to cut their hair short.

Since all four of the fatal victims were stabbed repeatedly, a minimum of seven and upwards of thirty times, Wuhan's police believed that the unidentified perpetrator was acting out of misogyny. They also thought that the suspect might be impotent, since the final of the fatal victims was sexually assaulted, but not vaginally raped. Wuhan's Public Security Bureau also commissioned a teacher at the Hubei Institute of Fine Arts to make a sculpture based on witness descriptions of the suspect. In the early hours of 10 August 2001, Wuhan PSB contacted Yueyang authorities after hearing about their search for Duan, having noticed similarities in physical descriptions and modus operandi. Five officers, led by Captain Yi, arrived in the city as consultants. They provided information including Duan's "Hu Cheng" alias. By 8:00 a.m. that same day, the bureau printed forty bulletins containing Duan's personal details and distributed them to all guesthouses in Wuchang District. Within ten minutes, a receptionist called police that a "Hu Cheng" of Duan's description had checked into her workplace.

== Arrest ==
On 13 August 2001, Duan was tracked down to a hotel and arrested by six armed officers as he attempted to flee through a bathroom window. Under the bedsheets in his room were the bloodstained murder weapon, a victim's handbag and other stolen items. His shoes were also positively matched to footprints at all four murder sites.

The investigative team headed by inspector Zhang Dehua was rewarded ¥70,000 by Chen Xunqiu, who credited "high-tech methods and strategies" by the Yueyang and Wuhan security bureaus. The Wuchang District bureau task force was rewarded ¥100,000. Yu Min, the receptionist who reported Duan's presence, received a reward of ¥20,000.

== Legal process ==
Duan was held at Wuhan No. 2 Detention Center. His trial began on 16 December 2002 and on 14 March 2003, he was sentenced to death. Duan was executed on 24 April 2003.

== See also ==
- List of serial killers in China
- List of serial killers by number of victims
