= Liu Mingwu =

Executed Chinese serial killer

- 刘明武
- Born: January 1960; Wulou, Songtao Miao Autonomous County, Guizhou, China
- Died: 6 November 2002 (aged 42); Lu'an, Anhui, China
- Cause of death: Execution by shooting
- Other names: "The Beggar Killer"; Tan Renhong
- Conviction: Murder x22
- Penalty: Death

Details
- Victims: 23+
- Span of crimes: 1992; 2001 – 2002
- Country: China
- States: Guizhou; Jiangsu; Anhui; Shanghai
- Date apprehended: 23 March 2002

Liu Mingwu (Chinese: 刘明武; pinyin: Liú Míngwǔ; January 1960 – 6 November 2002), known as The Beggar Killer (Chinese: 乞丐杀手; pinyin: Qǐgài Shāshǒu), was a Chinese beggar and serial killer who, from February 2001 to March 2002, attacked and killed at least 23 people, predominantly other beggars, across various cities in China. After his arrest, he claimed that he had done it out of hatred for the homeless, whom he considered "dirty and smelly." He was later convicted, sentenced to death, and subsequently executed in 2002.

== Early life and murders ==
Little is known of Liu Mingwu's background. Born in January 1960 in the small village of Wulou, in Guizhou's Songtao Miao Autonomous County, he was the child of a poor peasant family who eventually took over the farm as he grew up. He was considered a normal, upstanding citizen until sometime in 1992, when he got into a fight with the village cadres over land disputes. During this fight, he killed one of the cadres' sons and then fled to avoid arrest, wandering around the country and living as a beggar on the streets.

Despite his situation, Liu developed an inexplicable hatred of other beggars he encountered, whom he considered "dirty and smelly." Eventually, he resorted to killing them, reasoning that since they lived on the street, nobody would take interest in their deaths. The first known killings were recorded between February and October 2001, when approximately 15 beggars were either stabbed with a knife or bludgeoned with a brick before their bodies were set on fire. The killings occurred in the cities of Xuzhou and Suqian in Jiangsu and in Si County in Anhui.

From November 2001 to 21 March 2002, similar killings were recorded within Anhui. On 26 February, the burned body of a beggar was found under the Tongji Bridge in Feidong County, and ten days later, a fire broke out in a vacant house in Hefei. After putting the fire out, a human head was found among the ashes. By the time police had connected the two crimes, the burned body of an unknown man was found on 17 March in Lu'an, followed by that of another only four days later. Suspecting that the killings were the work of a single perpetrator, local authorities initiated a large-scale operation to track down the killer, frequently frisking and questioning any beggars they met on the streets.

== Arrest, trial and execution ==
On 23 March, the police noticed that a lone beggar, dressed in a fur coat and with disheveled hair, was squatting on the platform of a bus stop in Lu'an. When they approached him, they noticed a bloodstained knife wrapped up in newspaper in his hands and immediately brought him in for questioning at the police station. During the interrogation, the man claimed to be a 40-year-old from Hunan named Tan Renhong, and to the investigators' shock, he freely admitted that over the last two years, he had been traveling around the country and brutally killing beggars whenever he could, to the extent that he had lost count of how many had died at his hands.

Initially skeptical of his claims, the investigators conducted a background check on the man and learned that he was actually Liu Mingwu, a fugitive wanted for murder in Guizhou. After delving further into his purported murder spree, investigators were able to connect him to a further 22 murders committed between 2001 and 2002, considered an unprecedented amount of murders at the time. When pressed for a motive, Liu reiterated that his sole reason for killing the victims was because they were dirty beggars, leading authorities to believe that he was mentally ill and ordering a mental evaluation at the Provincial Psychiatric Hospital in Lu'an. The results concluded that he was sane and fully aware of the gravity of his actions.

On 28 August, Liu was tried before the Intermediate People's Court of Lu'an for the 23 murders that the authorities were able to link him to. During the proceedings, he expressed no remorse for his crimes, which was presented as an additional aggravating factor by the prosecution. As a result, Liu was sentenced to death and deprived of political rights. He was summarily executed by shooting on 6 November 2002.

== See also ==
- List of serial killers in China
