= Xu Guangcai =

Executed Chinese serial killer

- 许广才
- Born: 1960; Beijing, China
- Died: June 11, 1991 (aged 30–31); Beijing, China
- Cause of death: Execution by shooting
- Conviction: Murder x6
- Penalty: Death

Details
- Victims: 6
- Span of crimes: 1987–1990
- Country: China
- State: Beijing
- Date apprehended: April 3, 1990

Xu Guangcai (Chinese: 许广才; 1960 – June 11, 1991) was a Chinese serial killer who raped and murdered six young women in three different districts of Beijing from 1987 to 1990. He was captured while attempting to commit a new murder, and was later convicted, sentenced to death and executed in 1991.

== Early life and murders ==
Little is known of Xu Guangcai's background. A native of Beijing born in 1960, he came from a dysfunctional family and later had to drop out of high school in order to support his family. By the time he started his murder spree, he worked as a warehouse manager at an aluminum processing factory near Beijing railway station, was married and had children. Acquaintances and colleagues alike described him as a good, upstanding citizen who never had trouble with anybody and was always willing to lend a helping hand.

From August 1987 to October 1989, Xu would murder four different women who had recently moved to Beijing, focusing primarily in the districts of Chaoyang, Fengtai, and Daxing. His modus operandi involved approaching young women near the railway station and offering them jobs or asking them out for dinner. If the victim accompanied him, the pair would get on his bicycle and he would drive to a remote area, usually a vegetable field or an orchard. There, Xu would pull out a fruit knife and then tie them up using whatever ligatures he could find (ropes, victims' clothes, etc.), before raping and then repeatedly stabbing them in the chest and genitals, and ultimately disemboweling them. He would then get on his bicycle and leave the crime scene, abandoning the corpses in the dense shrubbery.

In July 1989, Xu approached a young woman named Cheng Mou at the Beijing railway station with a job offer. After the pair dined at a local restaurant and drank beer together, he repeated his usual pattern, but due to fierce resistance, he was unable to kill her and let Cheng escape. She later contacted the police and described her assailant as a man in his 30s, about 1.75 meters tall, with a medium build, speaking in a Beijing dialect and with a mustache. Cheng additionally described his bicycle as either a black or dark green men's 28 type, with a pink or yellow snap lock on the rear. Using this information, authorities collected any evidence they could gather from both the scene of the attack and the restaurant the pair had gone to, and while they managed to acquire the killer's fingerprints, they were unable to find a match. This led them to assume that the killer likely had no criminal record.

After killing his fourth victim in October, Xu temporarily ceased his killing spree until February 11 of next year, when the body of a young female tourist from Qinhuangdao was found in Fanjia, in the Fengtai District. On March 7, a similar case occurred in the same general area, leading local authorities to believe that they were committed by the same individual. The director of the local criminal division, Wang Jun, noticed that both murders shared a similarity with the cold case killing of Nankai University student Yang Mou, who had been murdered in Chaoyang on March 5, 1988. After examining footprints and bicycle tracks left at the crime scenes, authorities concluded that the two new murders were linked to the four previous unsolved killings that had plagued Beijing since 1987.

== Investigation, arrest, trial and execution ==
With the conclusion that all of the killings were done by a single perpetrator and with the description provided by Cheng, Wang ordered that a task force be formed to solve the killings. As a result, stakeouts were formed at the city's two central railway stations, from where the authorities suspected that the killer picked up his victims. On April 3, 1990, an undercover female investigator approached a stranger who seemed to have taken an interest in her, offering her a job at his factory. Unaware that he was being followed by police officers, Xu drove the investigator to a vegetable field, and just as he was about to attack her, he was confronted and apprehended by the officers. A latter examination of the fruit knife he was carrying linked it to the previous murders, as well as his own fingerprints.

At the subsequent trial, Xu readily confessed to his crimes, admitting that he had been luring, raping, and killing women for the past few years. Finding no mitigating factors in his case, the Beijing Intermediate People's Court sentenced him to death on June 11, 1991, with the sentence being carried out shortly after. For his efforts in solving the case, Wang Jun was awarded an order of merit.

== See also ==
- List of serial killers in China
