= Kuangqu, Yangquan =

Kuangqu 矿区
- District
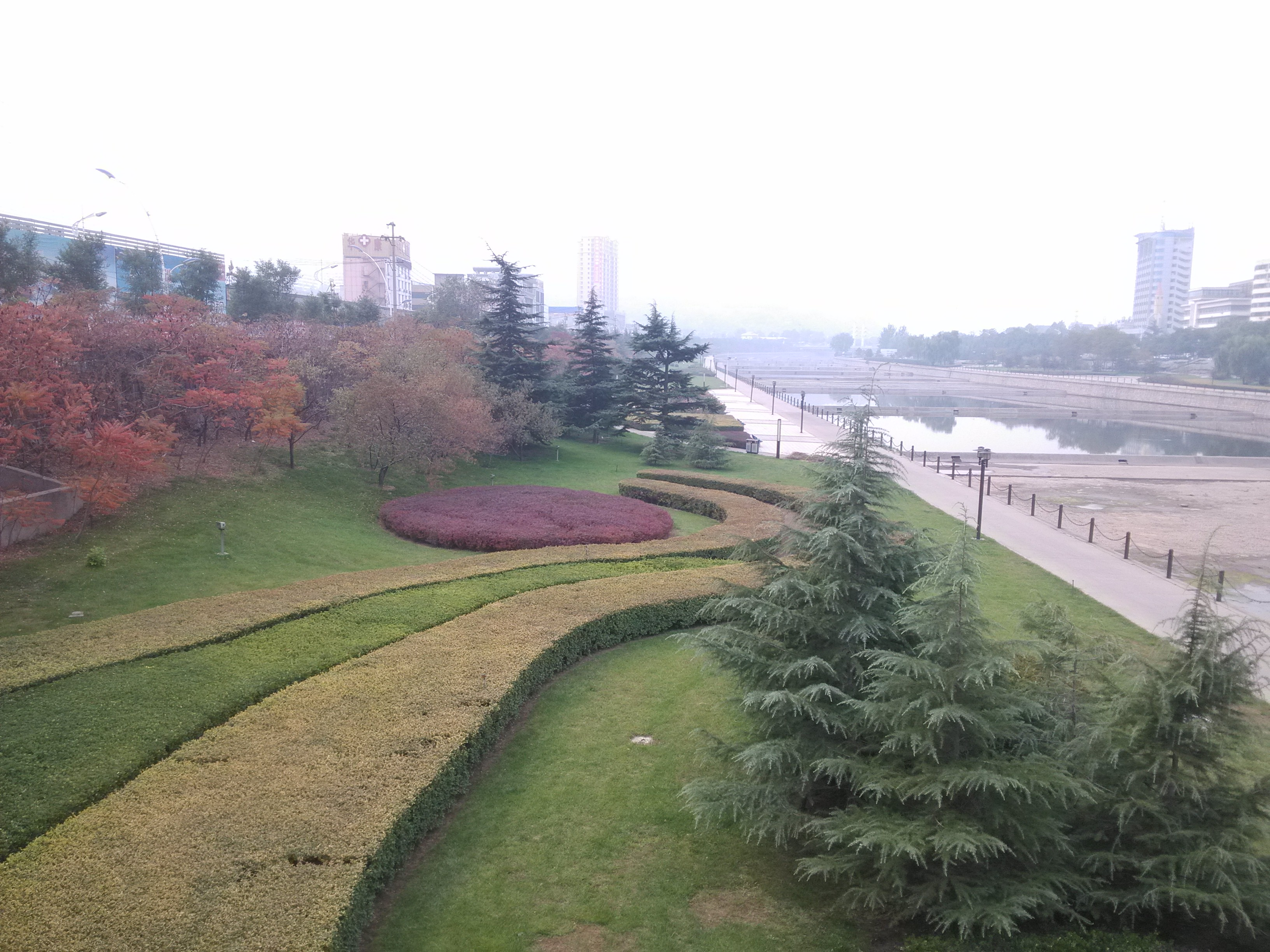

- Location in Shanxi
- Coordinates: 37°52′08″N 113°33′24″E
- Country: People's Republic of China
- Province: Shanxi
- Prefecture-level city: Yangquan

Area
  - Total: 10 km^{2} (3.9 sq mi)

Population
  - Total: 220,000
  - Density: 22,000/km^{2} (57,000/sq mi)
- Time zone: UTC+8 (China Standard)
- Website: http://www.yqkq.gov.cn/

Kuangqu (simplified Chinese: 矿区; traditional Chinese: 礦區; pinyin: Kuàngqū; lit. 'mining district') is a district of Yangquan, Shanxi province, China. As of 2002, it has a population of 220,000 residing in an area of 10 km^{2} (3.9 sq mi).
