= James Hall Museum of Transport =

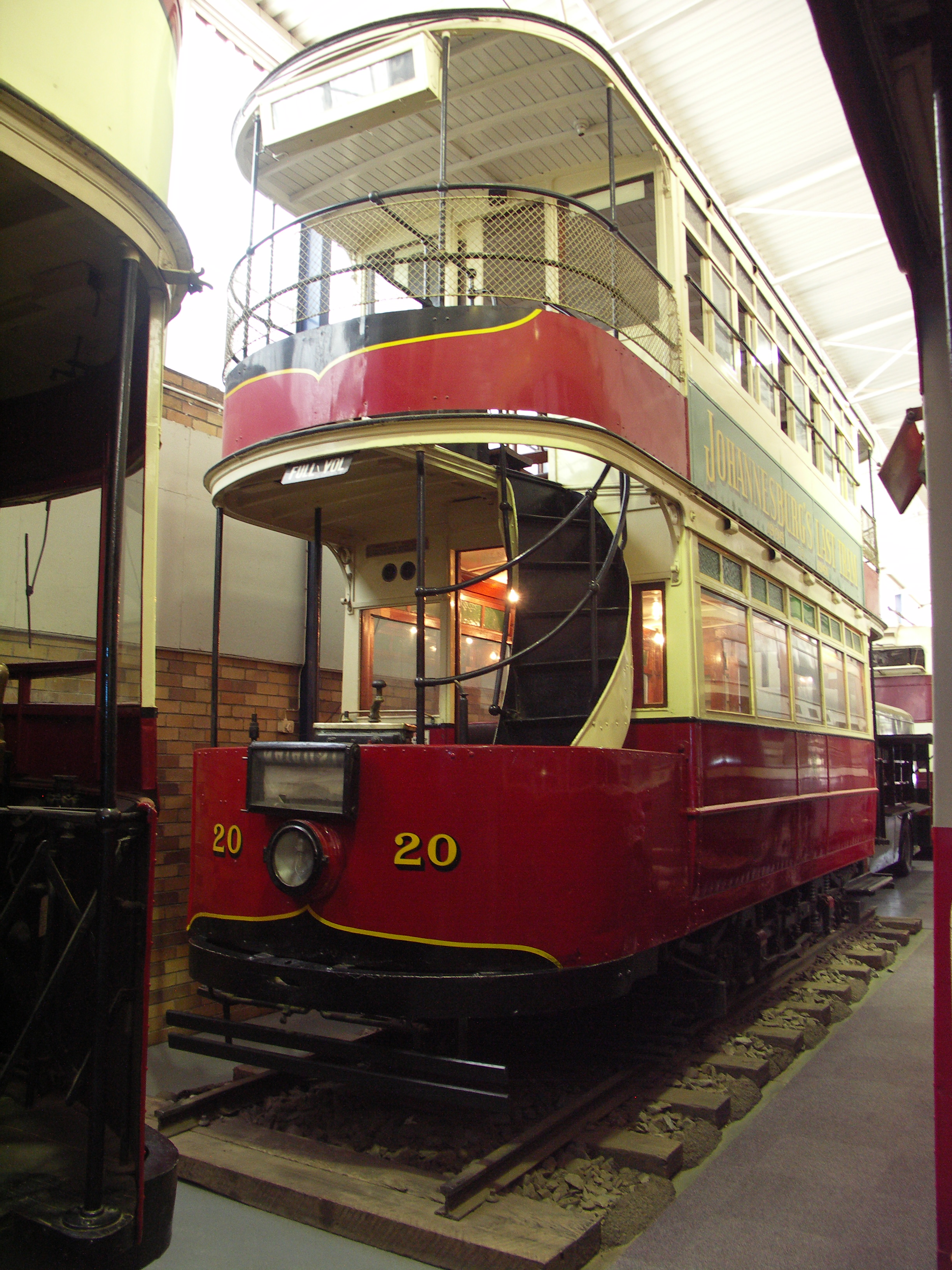
- The last tram ran from 1906 to 18 March 1961.
- Established: February 1964; 62 years ago
- Location: La Rochelle, Johannesburg, South Africa
- Coordinates: 26.23406°S 28.05355°E
- Type: Transport museum
- Founders: James Hall, City of Johannesburg
- Curator: Gaisang Sathekge
- Website: jhmt.org.za

James Hall Museum of Transport is a transport museum that aims to preserve and promote the history of hundreds of years of transport in South Africa in particular, and Africa in general. It is the largest transport museum in Africa. It is located at Pioneers' Park beside the Wemmer Pan in La Rochelle, Johannesburg, South Africa. It was established in 1964 by Jimmie Hall and the City of Johannesburg.

== Exhibits ==
=== Carts (1870-1910) ===
The museum exhibits carriages from the period 1870 to 1910. These include Cape carts, two-wheeled carriages that were specially adapted for use on the South African roads; also rickshaws, hearses, mail coaches and ox wagons.

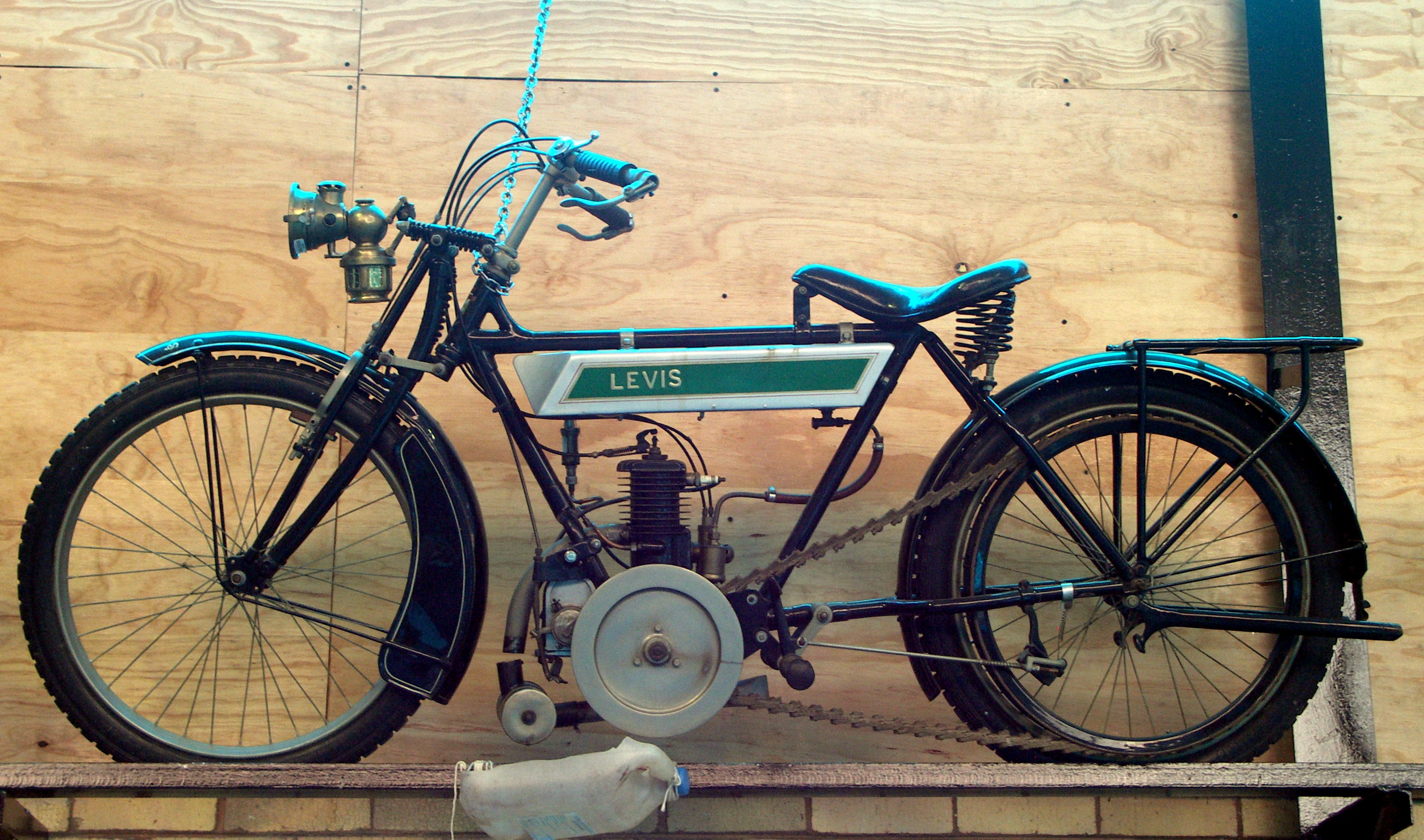
Levis motorcycle.

=== Bicycles and Motorbikes (1886-1960) ===
Some of the two-wheeled vehicles housed within the museum are penny-farthings, tandems, tricycles, and vintage and classic motorcycles.

=== Buses and Coaches ===
This collection includes several double decker buses formerly used in Cape Town, Johannesburg and Durban. There are vehicles from Daimler, Leyland, AEC and Guy. A 1952 RT double-decker London bus has been preserved, in working order, and is used for sightseeing tours. It also has a 1958 Guy double-decker diesel bus, one of 30 ever produced.

=== Fire Engines and Equipment (1877-1960) ===
The exhibit has a range of fire engines and firefighting equipment, from a 1913 Merryweather Steam Pump to a 1947 Dennis with an 8-cylinder Rolls-Royce engine. Others include the 1936 Magirus Deutz with a 45-metre extension ladder and a Ford Thames fire engine from the Randburg Fire Department.

Firefighting artefacts included in the exhibit are extinguishers, fire buckets, fire alarms, hand pumps, and hoses, and the original alarm board and switch box mechanism from the Berea Fire Station.

Other fire engines include:

- 1928 Morris Magirus Tower Ladder fire engine from the Johannesburg Fire Department
- 1935 Leyland Tower Ladder fire engine from the East London Fire Department
- 1939 Magrius Tower Ladder fire engine from the Johannesburg Fire Department
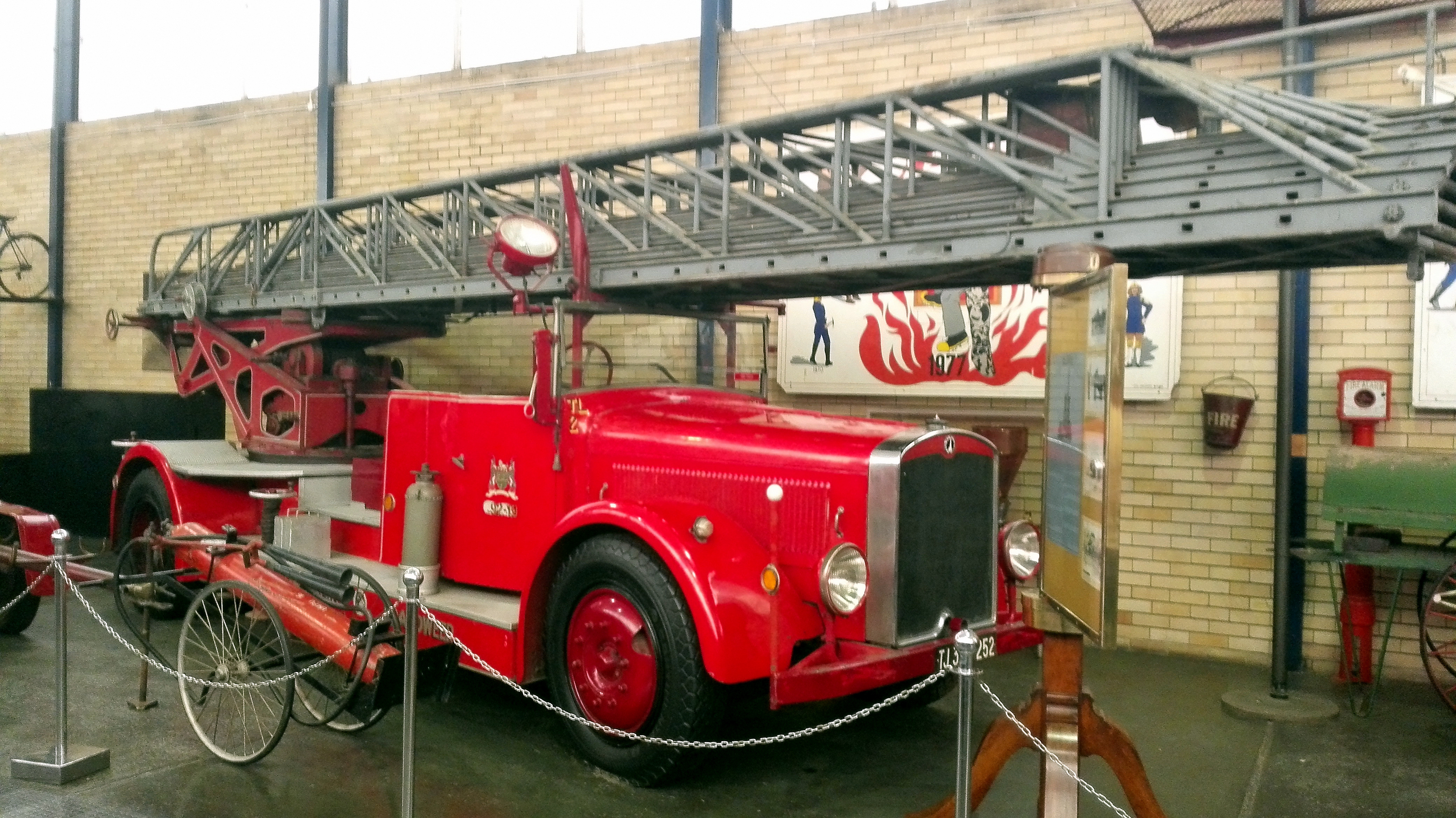
  1939 Magirus turntable ladder.

=== Motor Vehicles (1900-1980) ===
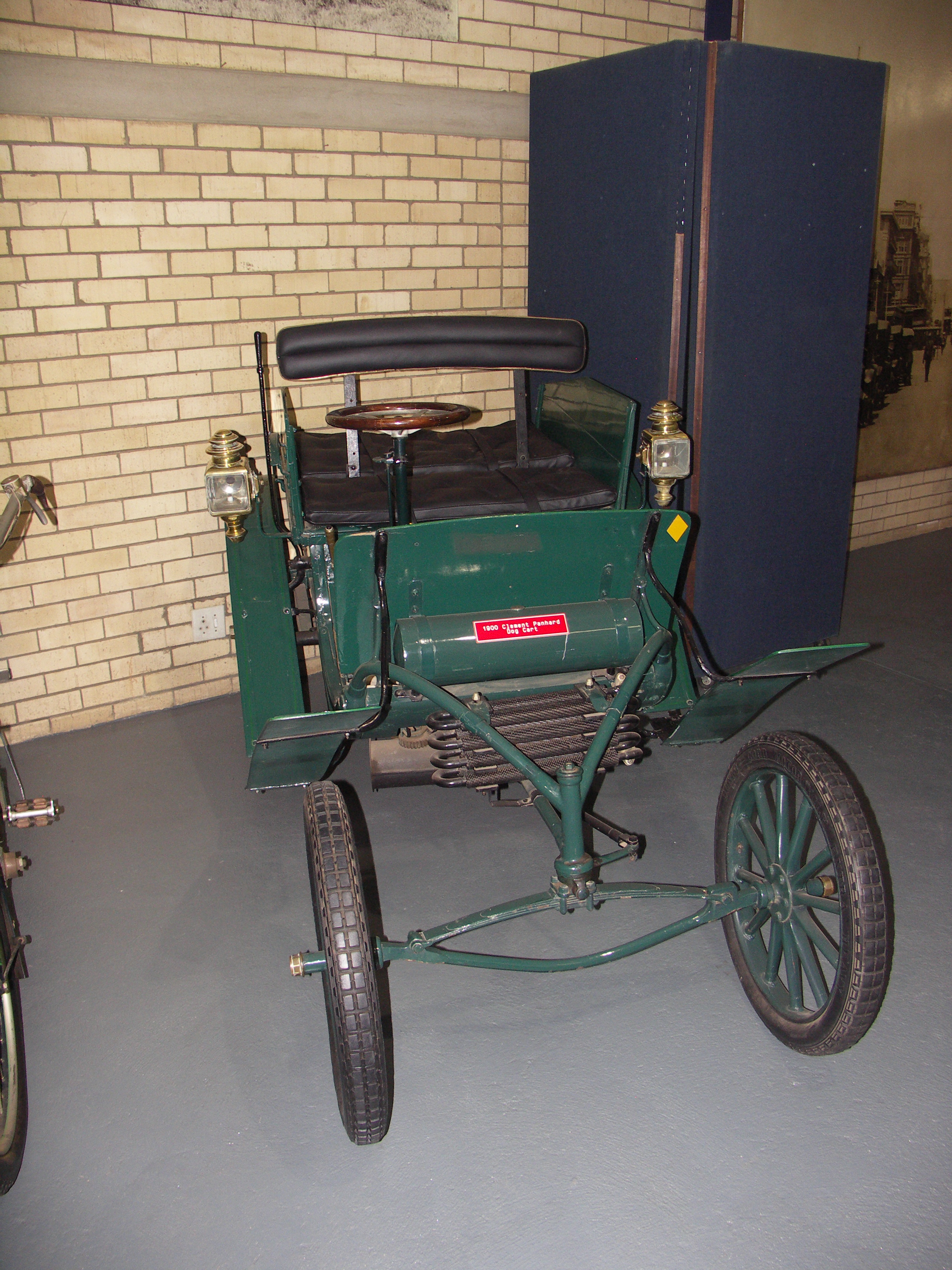
Clément-Panhard: Type VCP (1900), Chassis No. 328, Engine No. 328; completed the 1928 Emancipation Run with an average speed of 22 kph.

The museum has variety of motor vehicles with the oldest being a 1900 Clément-Panhard. The Clément-Panhard took part in the 1928 Emancipation Run and finished with an average speed of 22 kph. It has a 1959 Mayoral Rolls-Royce.

=== Steam-driven vehicles ===
The museum has a number of steam powered vehicles on display. From "Texas Jack", a famous steam tractor used in the Witwatersrand mines. A Sentinel steam wagon served to transport coal and haul away scrap at the mines.

Other vehicles include:

- 1933 Sentinel steam bus from Pilgram's Rest
- 1939 John Fowler B7 "Lion" Jib crane

=== Trams and Trolley Buses (1896-1986) ===
The museum houses the first horse-drawn tram which was in use in Johannesburg from 1891 to 1902. It had maximum speed of 11 kilometres per hour (6.8 mph), drawn by two horses on a track laid in the middle of the road.

The museum also has the last tram ever ran from 1906 to 18 March 1961, and double-decker electric trams on display.

Other trams and trolleybuses include:

- Brill electric tram that ran in Kimberley from 1913 to 1939
- BUT AEC trolleybus that ran in Johannesburg from 1948 to 1974
- Daimler trolleybus No. 177 that was run by Pretoria City Transport from 1949 to 1972

== Gallery ==
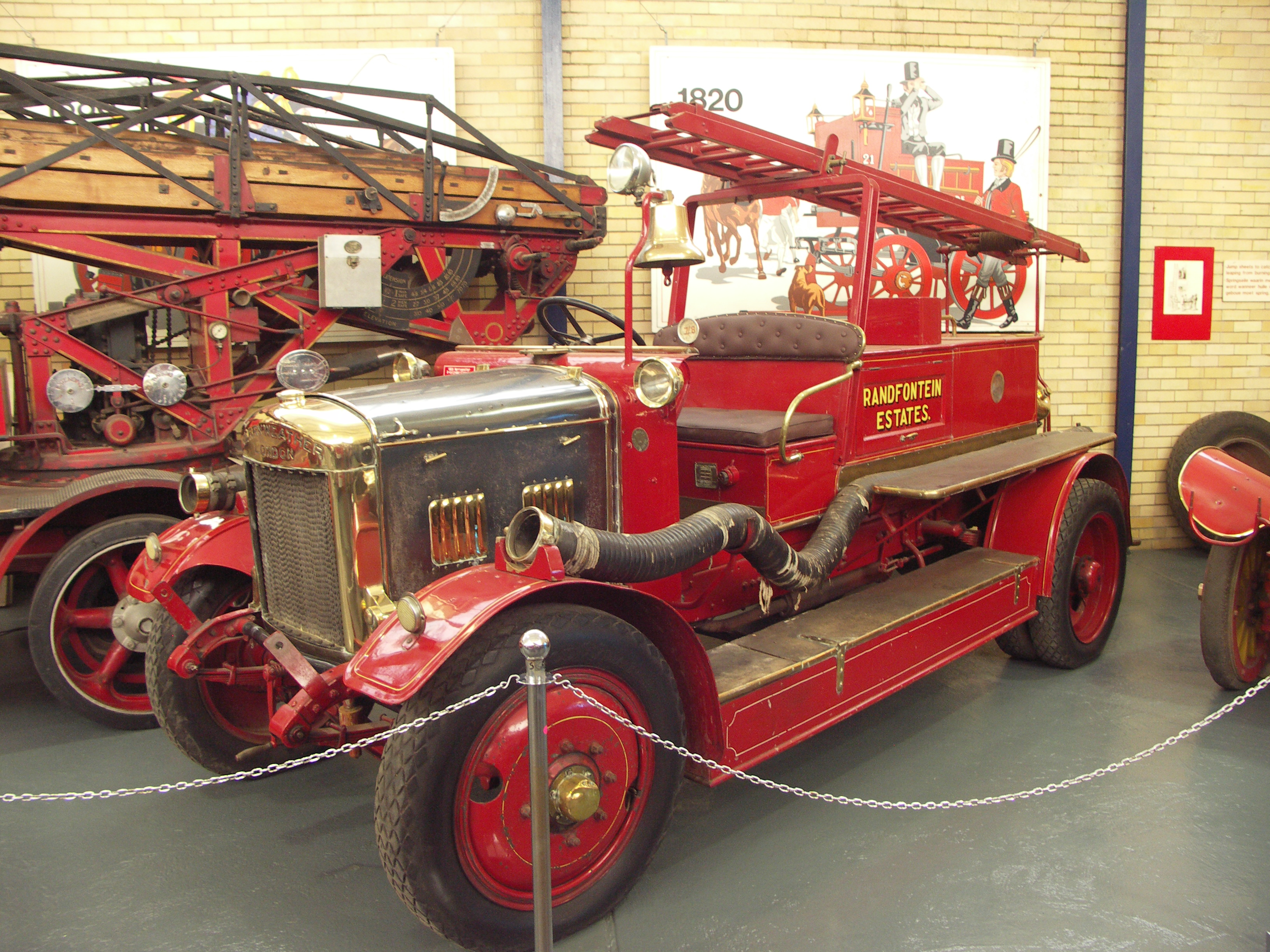
Merryweather fire engine

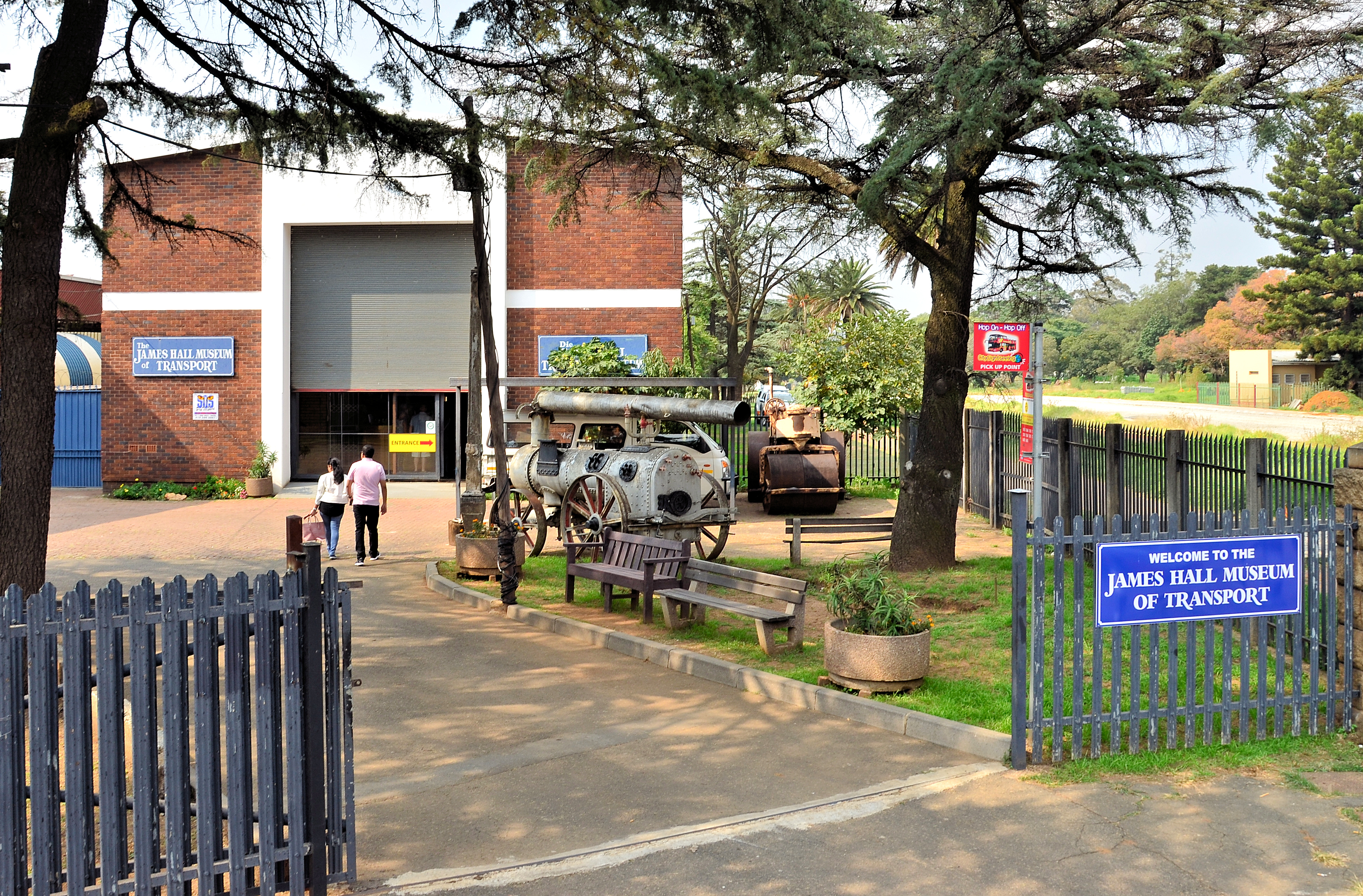
Entrance

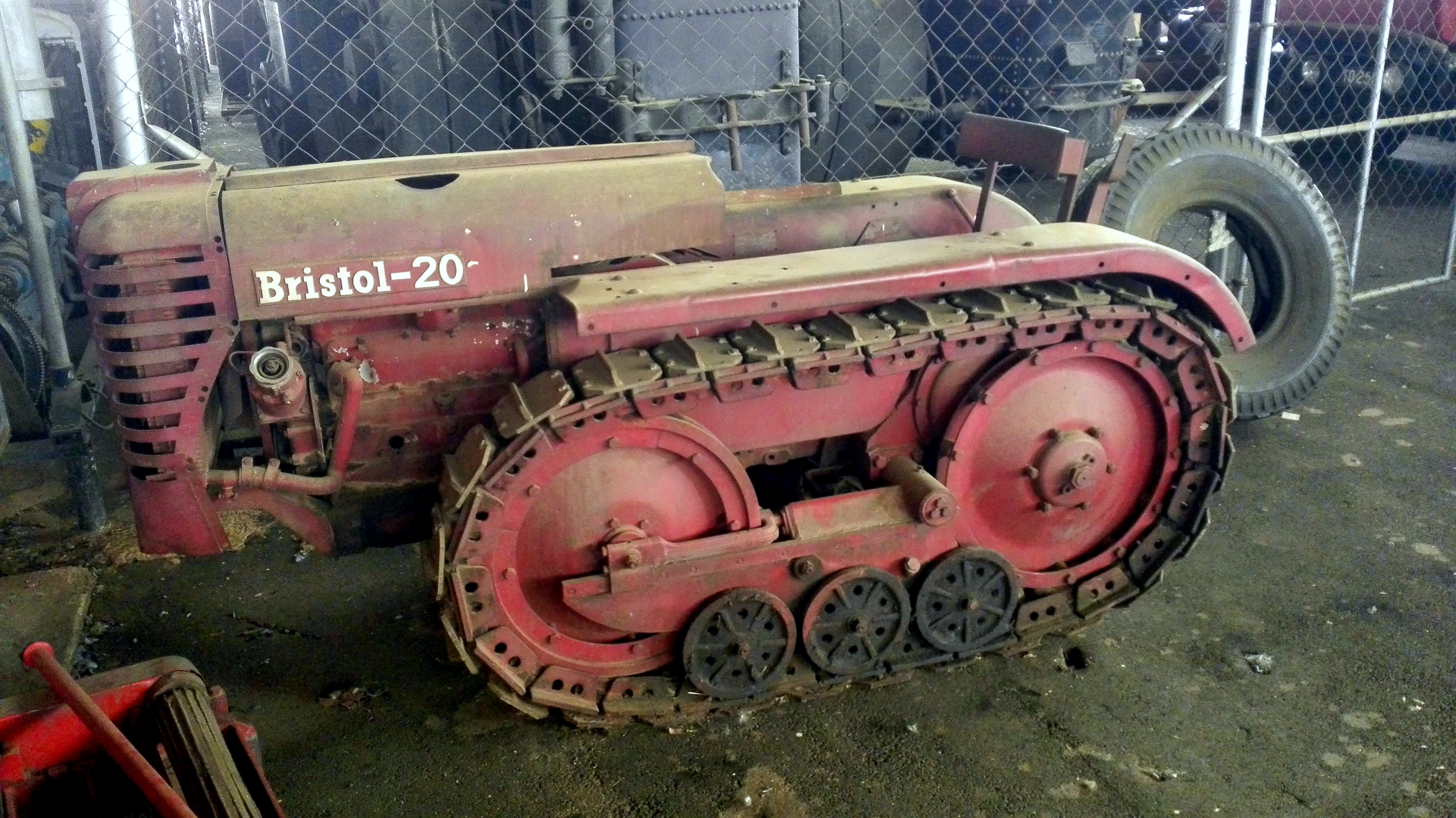
Bristol 20 crawler tractor

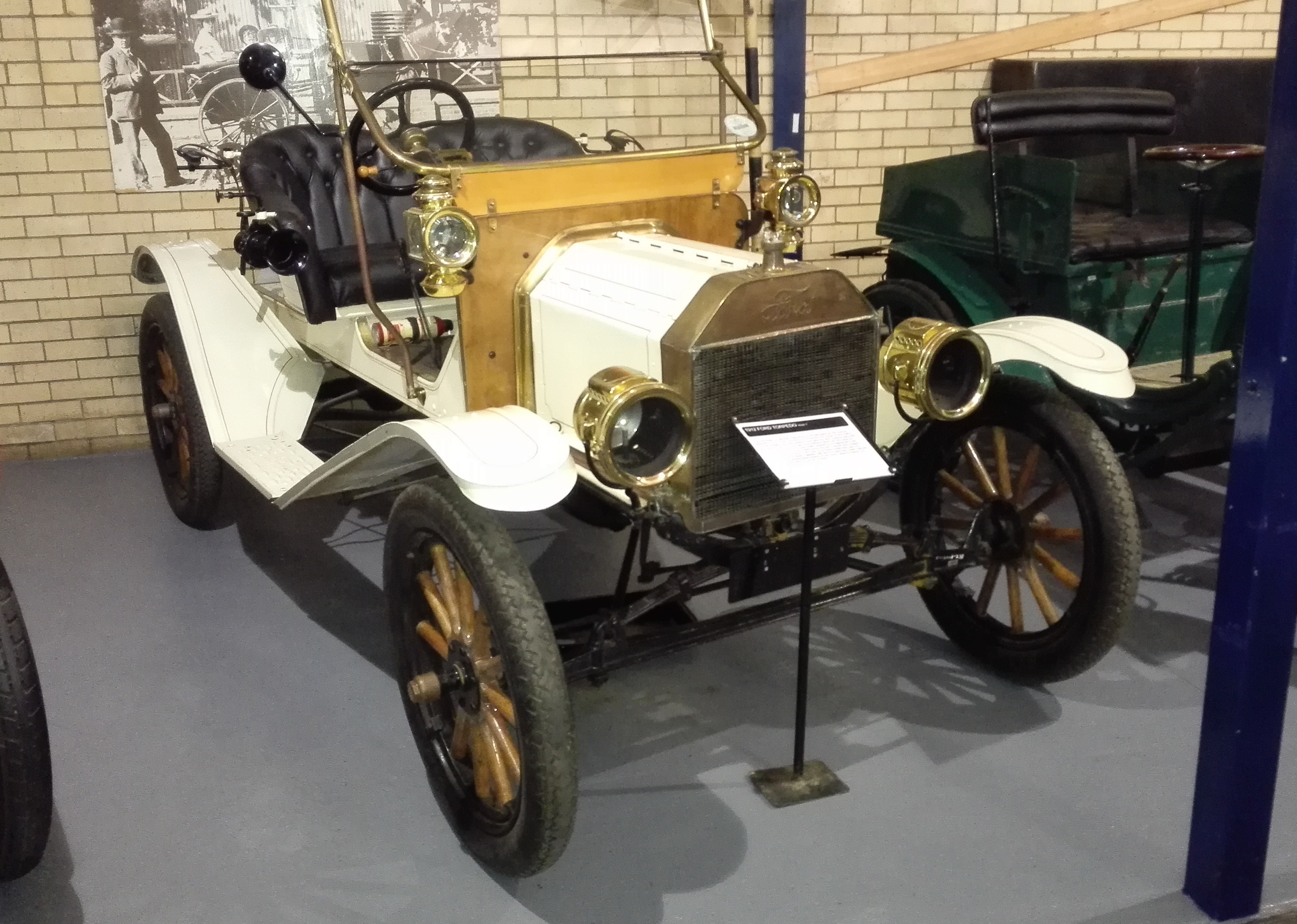
Ford Torpedo from 1912

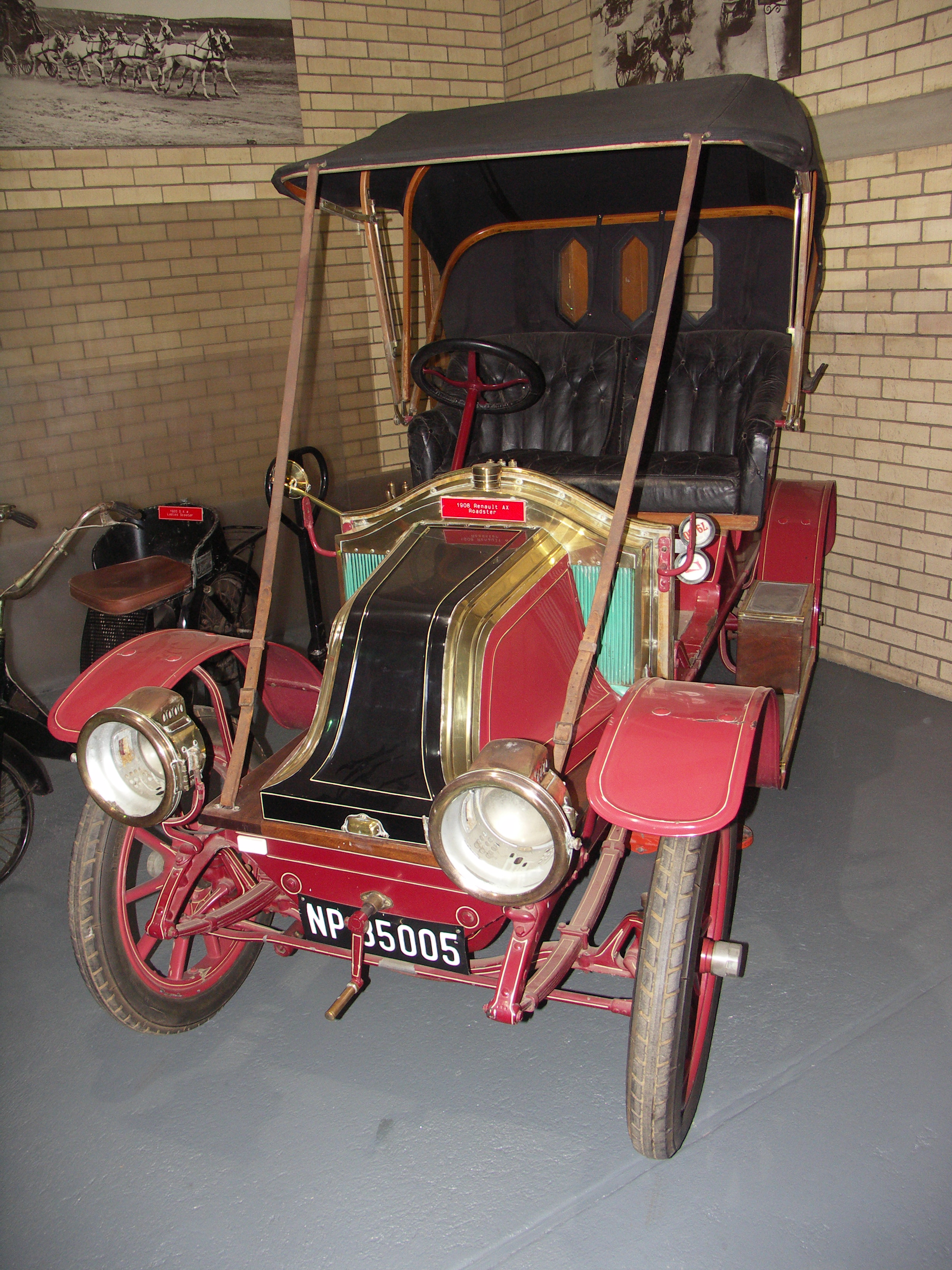
1908 Renault AX Roadster

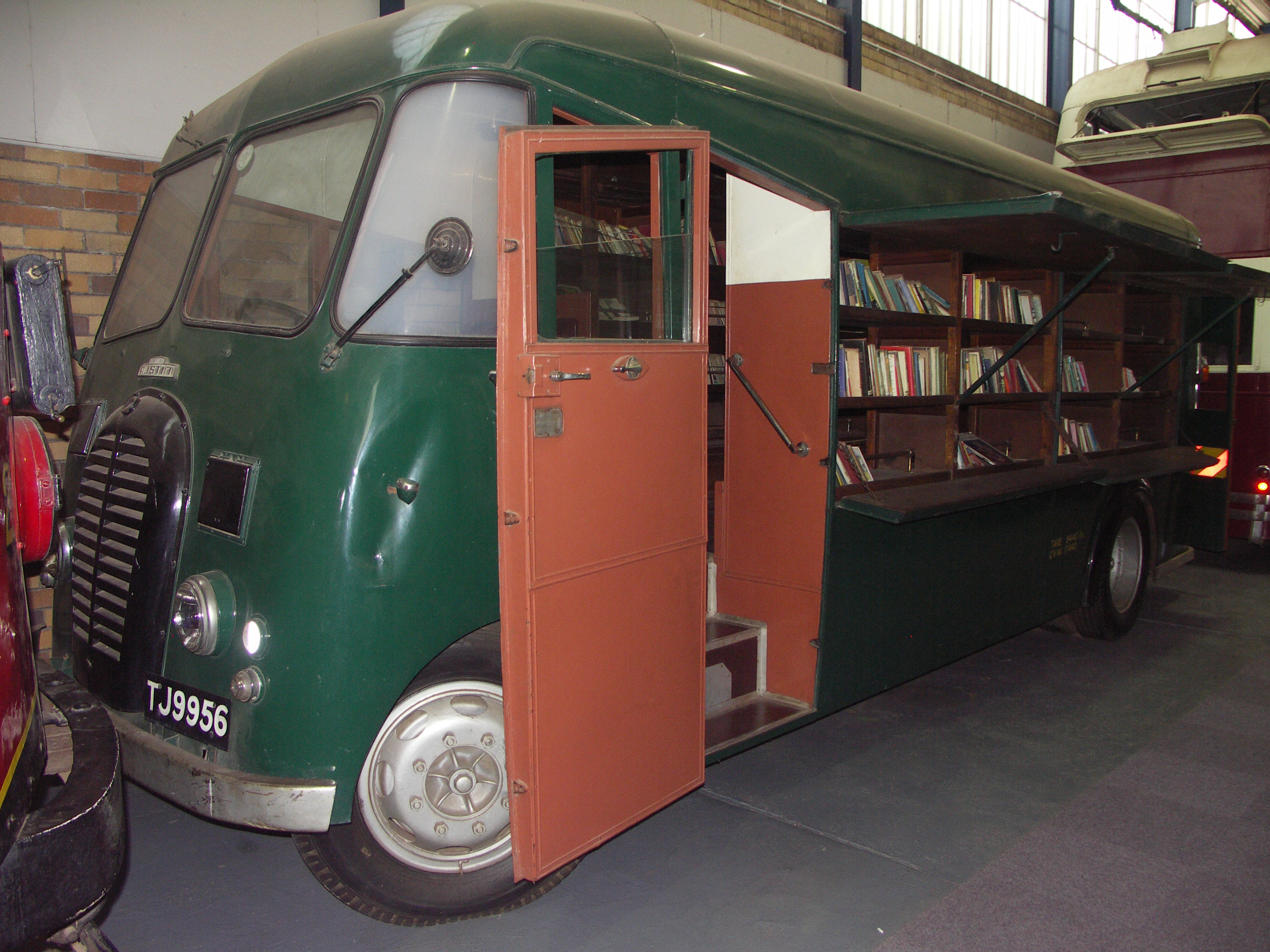
A travelling library used in Johannesburg, between 1955 and 1965.

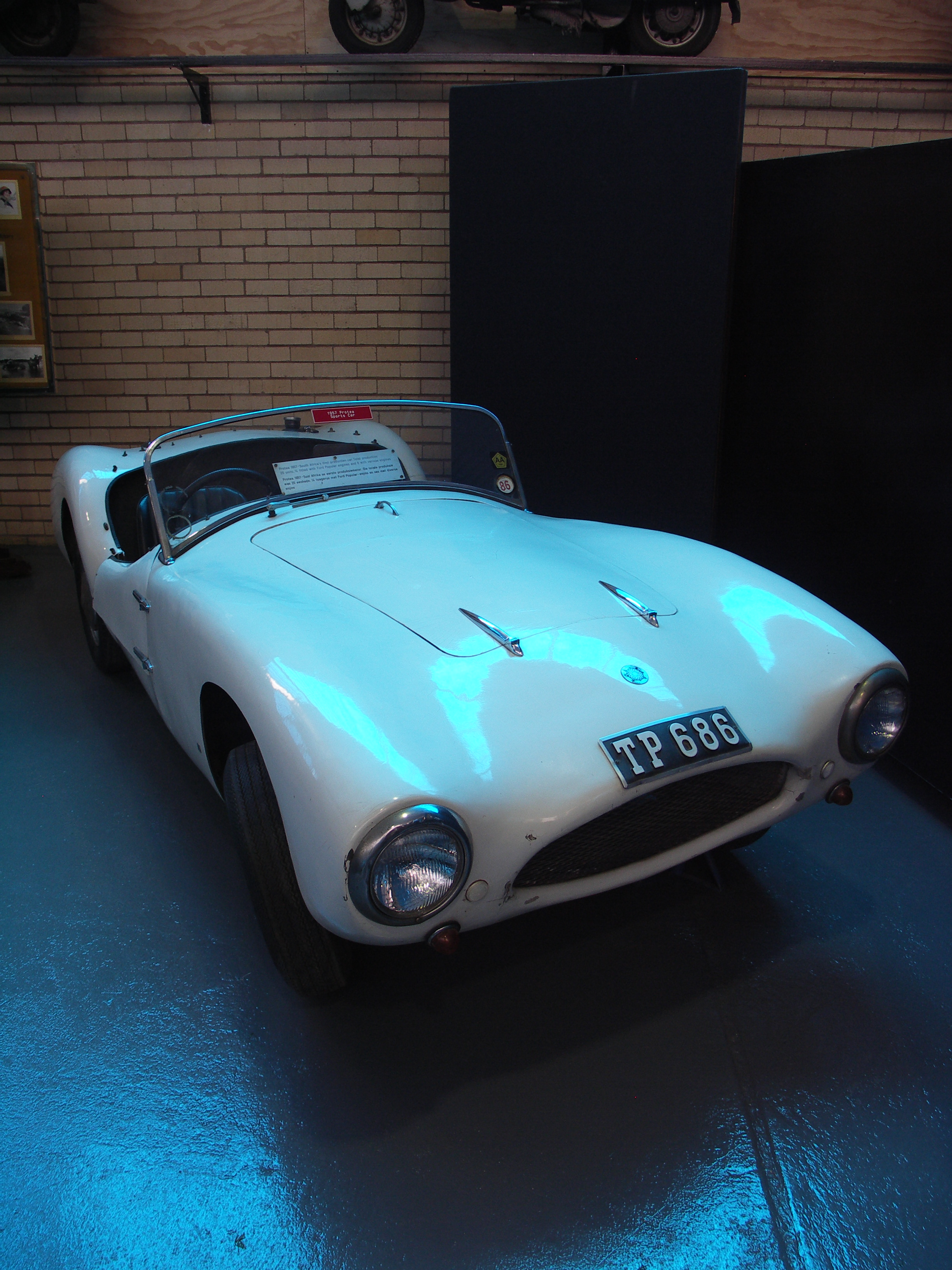
The South African manufactured Protea sports car.

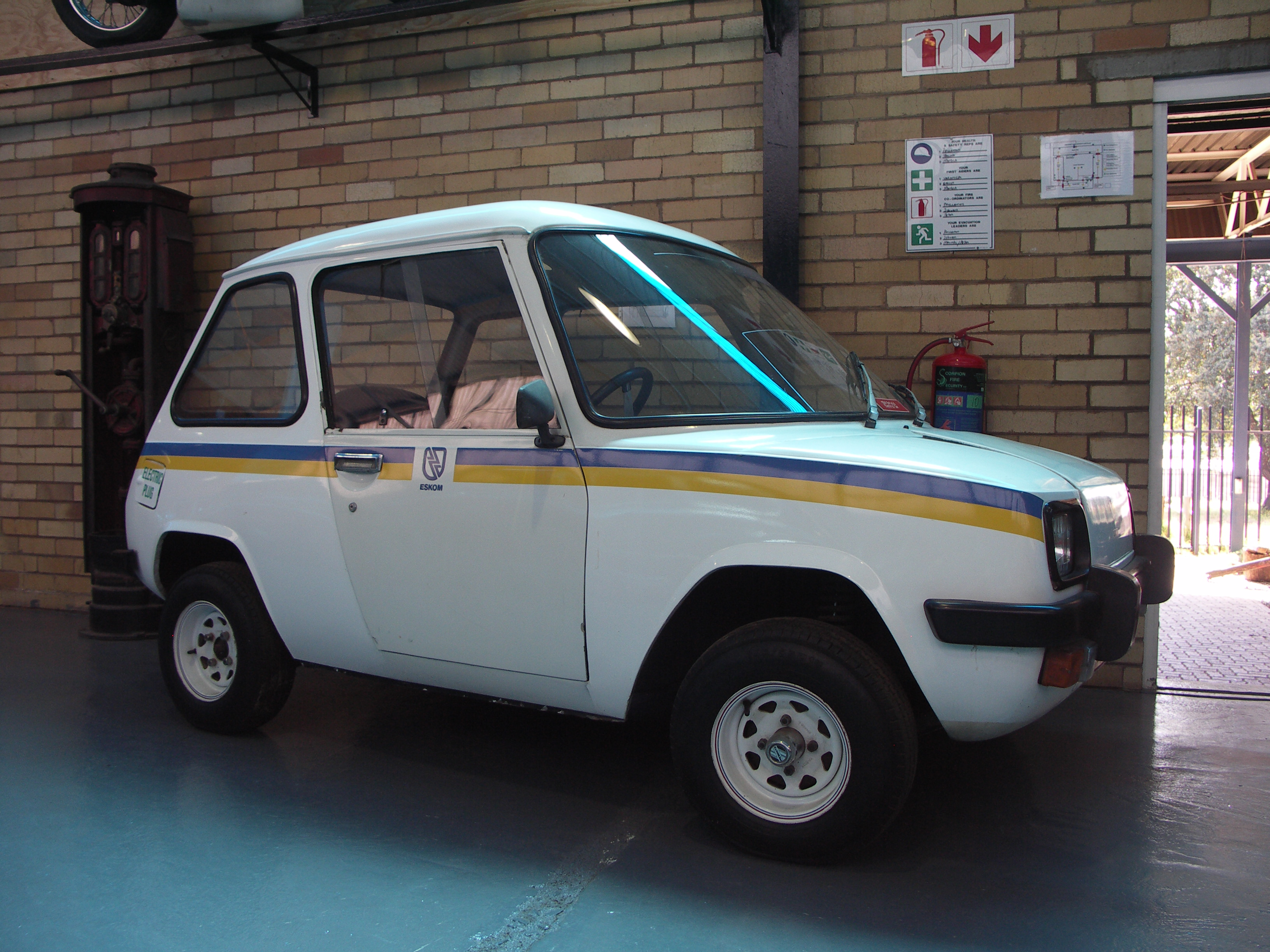
Eskom Enfield 8000 electric powered car

== See also ==
- List of museums in South Africa
- Trams in Johannesburg
- Trolleybuses in Johannesburg
