= Berea station =

Berea station could refer to:

- Berea Union Depot, a disused train station in Berea, Ohio
- Berea station (Kentucky), a disused train station in Berea, Kentucky
- Berea Fire Station, a building in Johannesburg, South Africa
