= Cedric Maake =

South African serial killer

- Born: Maoupa Cedric Maake; South Africa
- Other name: The Wemmer Pan Killer
- Convictions: Murder (27 counts); Attempted murder (26 counts); Rape (14 counts); Robbery with aggravating circumstances (41 counts)
- Penalty: 1,340 years imprisonment

Details
- Victims: 27+
- Span of crimes: 1996–1997
- Country: South Africa
- State: Gauteng
- Date apprehended: December 1997

Maoupa Cedric Maake, known as the Wemmer Pan Killer, is a South African serial killer who was convicted of 27 murders but was suspected of killing many more.

== Early life and education ==
Maoupa Cedric Maake was born in 1965 in South Africa. His father died when he was in Standard 8 (now Grade 10), and he decided to leave school at that time to help care for his family. He moved to Johannesburg to look for work and became a plumber, working for himself.

Maake had a wife and four children in Limpopo and a girlfriend in Johannesburg. At 33 years old he was living in La Rochelle, Johannesburg when seemingly without a trigger he began a life of crime.

== Crimes ==
Maake committed at least 27 murders throughout 1996 and 1997.

Maake is known as the "Wemmer Pan Killer" because it was in the Wemmer Pan area of Johannesburg that he targeted most of his victims, beginning in April 1996. At first the Brixton Murder and Robbery Unit of the South African Police Service (SAPS), the unit primarily responsible for the investigation of serial killers in the Johannesburg Police Area, did not link his crimes together, believing that they were the work of two separate serial killers due to the difference in patterns between the murders. During the investigation of Maake's murders, two separate criminal profiles were created; one for the "Wemmer Pan" murderer and one for "Hammer" murders.

=== Small business owner attacks ===
On 28 December 1996, Antonio Alfonso was working in Hill Gardens Café in High Street, Rosettenville. Maake entered the café and without warning attacked Alfonso with a hammer. He stole R400 from the cash register and fled. Alfonso survived the attack. Maake used the proceeds of this robbery to celebrate the new year.

On 6 January 1997 around 10:00 am, Maake entered and robbed a shop owned by Magan Khanjee. He struck Khanjee with a shifting spanner until he was unconscious, then stole five pairs of trousers from the shop.

Two days later, Maake bludgeoned Kenny Chan with a hammer and stole money from the till. His crimes only got worse. He struck Khantilal Lutchman with a hammer and stole his wallet in a tailor shop. The same incident happened to an Abdul Bulbulia in Newtown. His first murder victim was Dhansuklal Patel who died in hospital after Maake bludgeoned him with a hammer and stole his wallet.

=== Couples in cars at Wemmer Pan ===
In April 1997, Cedric Maake attacked Muntu Hlatshwayo and his female companion in the La Rochelle area near Wemmer Pan. Hlatshwayo was shot and killed while sitting in his car, after which Maake robbed him of personal belongings, including his female companion’s purse, car radio and a firearm. The stolen firearm was later linked to other crimes in Maake’s murder spree. During the same incident, Maake raped Hlatshwayo’s female companion and then murdered her, following a pattern seen in several of his attacks on couples. Maake was later convicted in the Johannesburg High Court of the murder of Hlatshwayo and the rape and murder of his companion as part of the series of crimes for which he received multiple life sentences.

In June 1997, Cedric Maake murdered Ralph Ngwenya and Ngwenya’s female companion during an attack linked to his series of crimes around southern Johannesburg. Ngwenya was robbed of a pair of shoes before being murdered, indicating that the attack had a robbery component in addition to lethal violence. After killing Ngwenya, Maake sexually assaulted (raped) Ngwenya’s female companion and then murdered her, leaving no surviving witness. The sequence of events mirrors Maake’s established pattern in attacks on couples, in which the male victim was killed first and the female victim was subjected to sexual violence before being murdered. Maake was later convicted in the Johannesburg High Court of both murders and the associated rape as part of the charges that resulted in multiple life sentences.

In mid-1997 (reported during the June–July 1997 phase of the spree), Cedric Maake murdered Jerry Khanya Naidoo during an attack that formed part of his ongoing series of crimes in and around Johannesburg. Court reporting identified Naidoo as one of the victims whose death occurred during an assault on a couple. During the same incident, Naidoo’s female companion was sexually assaulted (raped). Press coverage indicates that the attack followed Maake’s recurring pattern: the male victim was killed, while the female companion was subjected to sexual violence. In some reports, the companion is listed among those who were assaulted and later killed, while in others the emphasis is on the rape linked to Naidoo’s murder. Cedric Maake was subsequently convicted in the Johannesburg High Court of Naidoo’s murder and the associated sexual offence as part of the series of charges that resulted in multiple life sentences.

The Wemmer Pan murders involved several patterns of victims. The first were men and women walking alone whom Maake bludgeoned to death with rocks. The second group of Wemmer Pan victims were couples in cars around the Wemmer Pan area whom Maake would assault, shooting the men and raping the women.

The second criminal profile the police created involved murders of tailors in the inner city area, killed in their shops with hammers. The connection between the Wemmer Pan murders and the Hammer killings was made by Superintendent Piet Byleveld on 12 January 1998. Maake took Byleveld to a pawn shop in La Rochelle in the south of Johannesburg where he had sold the bicycle of Gerhard Lavoo, a victim in the Wemmer Pan murders, for R120. The alias he used on the receipt was "Patrick Mokwena", the same alias he had used to check in a shirt at one of the tailors before Maake murdered him.

== Arrest and conviction ==
Maake was arrested in December 1997 as a suspect in the Wemmer Pan murders and initially acknowledged responsibility for the crimes. He cooperated with police officers on several occasions to lead them around the vicinity and point out the locations of his crimes. The data generated by this was later used with Geographic Information Systems (GIS) and crime mapping technology to provide diagrams of the geographical extent of the serial murders. The Wemmer Pan serial killer trial was one of the earliest uses of GIS to aid in court prosecution by the SAPS. Geographic profiling later revealed that the majority of Maake's murders were centred on his two residences, the place where he worked, and the residences of his brother and girlfriend.

Maake was charged with 36 counts of murder, 28 attempted murders, 15 counts of rape, 46 counts of aggravated robbery, and other offences relating to the unlawful possession of firearms and ammunition. In court Maake pleaded not guilty to all charges. One month after his arrest he confessed to the "Hammer" murders.

On 6 September 2000, he was convicted of 27 murders, 26 attempted murders, 14 rapes, 41 aggravated robberies, and many more less serious offences.

He was found guilty of 114 of 134 charges in all and was sentenced to 27 life sentences (one life sentence for each murder) plus 1159 years and 3 months imprisonment. In total, his sentence amounted to 1,340 years in prison.

== In media ==
Cedric Maake was featured in a 13-part M-Net television series called Criminal Minds hosted by Malcolm Gooding.

== See also ==
- List of serial killers in South Africa
- List of serial killers by number of victims
