= Wemmer Pan =

Lake in Pioneers' Park, Johannesburg, South Africa

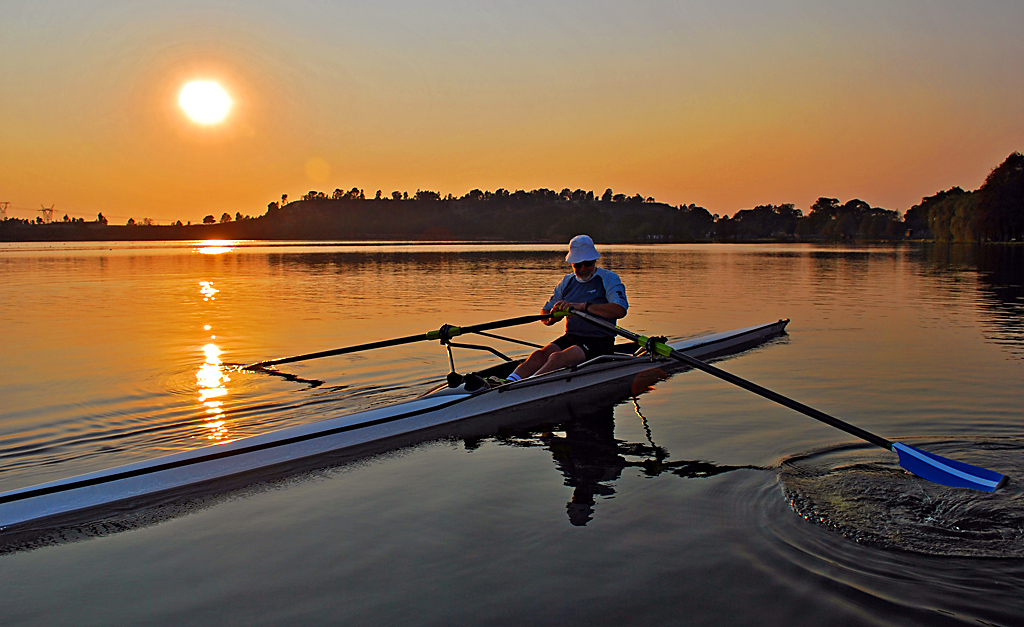
- A sculler rows at dawn on Wemmer Pan

- Location within South Africa
- Location: Johannesburg, South Africa
- Coordinates: 26.23°S 28.06°E

Wemmer Pan is a lake and recreational area in Johannesburg, South Africa. It is located to the south of the city centre, in the suburb of La Rochelle.

== History ==
"Pan" is an Afrikaans and South African English word for a shallow lake.

The Wemmer Pan was named after Sam Wemmer. It was originally a quarry, and was later taken over by the City Deep Mine which required the water for mining purposes.

Wemmer Pan is part of Pioneers' Park, which was built at the turn of the 20th century. Pioneers' Park was formally opened on 26 April 1924 by the Governor General, the Earl of Athlone, on land bought by the City Council. The park is named in memory of the founders of Johannesburg and of the gold mining industry of which it is the centre.

== Amenities ==
Wemmer Pan is home to a number of rowing clubs, including Wemmer Pan Rowing Club (established in 1911), and hosts a number of short course regattas, including the annual Wemmer Sprint Regatta. It is also home the annual Dragon Boat Corporate Spring Festival Regatta. The park provides space for picnicking and water activities, and it once again boasts illuminated musical fountains.

Johannesburg's Turffontein Racecourse is opposite Wemmer Pan.

On the banks of the lake is Santarama Miniland, which contains about 80 scale models of notable buildings and locations from around South Africa, on a scale of 1:25. These include a scale model of Robben Island, where Nelson Mandela was held prisoner, the Union Buildings and the Hillbrow Tower. A full-scale replica of Jan van Riebeeck's ship, the Dromedarus, takes visitors on a free boat ride on the lake. Also included are a mini-golf course, miniature railroads, a miniature harbor and a cableway.

Next door is the James Hall Transport Museum, which is the largest transport museum in Africa. It was established in 1964 by Jimmie Hall, and it preserves and promotes the history of over 400 years of transport in South Africa in particular and Africa in general. The collection includes over 400 years’ worth of various modes of land transport that range from steam-driven vehicles, trains, trams and trolley buses, to animal-drawn carriages, early bicycles and cars. The courtyard houses a number of steam vehicles, some of them still in working order.

== Other events ==
Serial killer Cedric Maake, who committed at least 27 murders throughout 1996 and 1997, was known as the Wemmer Pan Killer because a number of his victims were found in the vicinity.
