= Trolleybuses in Johannesburg =

Public transport network

Johannesburg trolleybus system

Operation
- Locale: Johannesburg, South Africa
- Open: 26 August 1936
- Close: 10 January 1986
- Status: Closed

The Johannesburg trolleybus system was part of the public transport network in Johannesburg, South Africa, for nearly 50 years in the mid-twentieth century.

== History ==
Opened on 26 August 1936, the system gradually supplemented the Johannesburg tramway network.

The system eventually partially replaced the tramway network, which lasted for several more decades until its closure on 18 March 1961. The trolleybus system closed on 10 January 1986.

== See also ==
- James Hall Transport Museum
- History of Johannesburg
- List of trolleybus systems
