= Trams in Johannesburg =

Tramway network of Johannesburg, South Africa

Coordinates: 26°12′15″S 28°2′25″E

Johannesburg tramway network
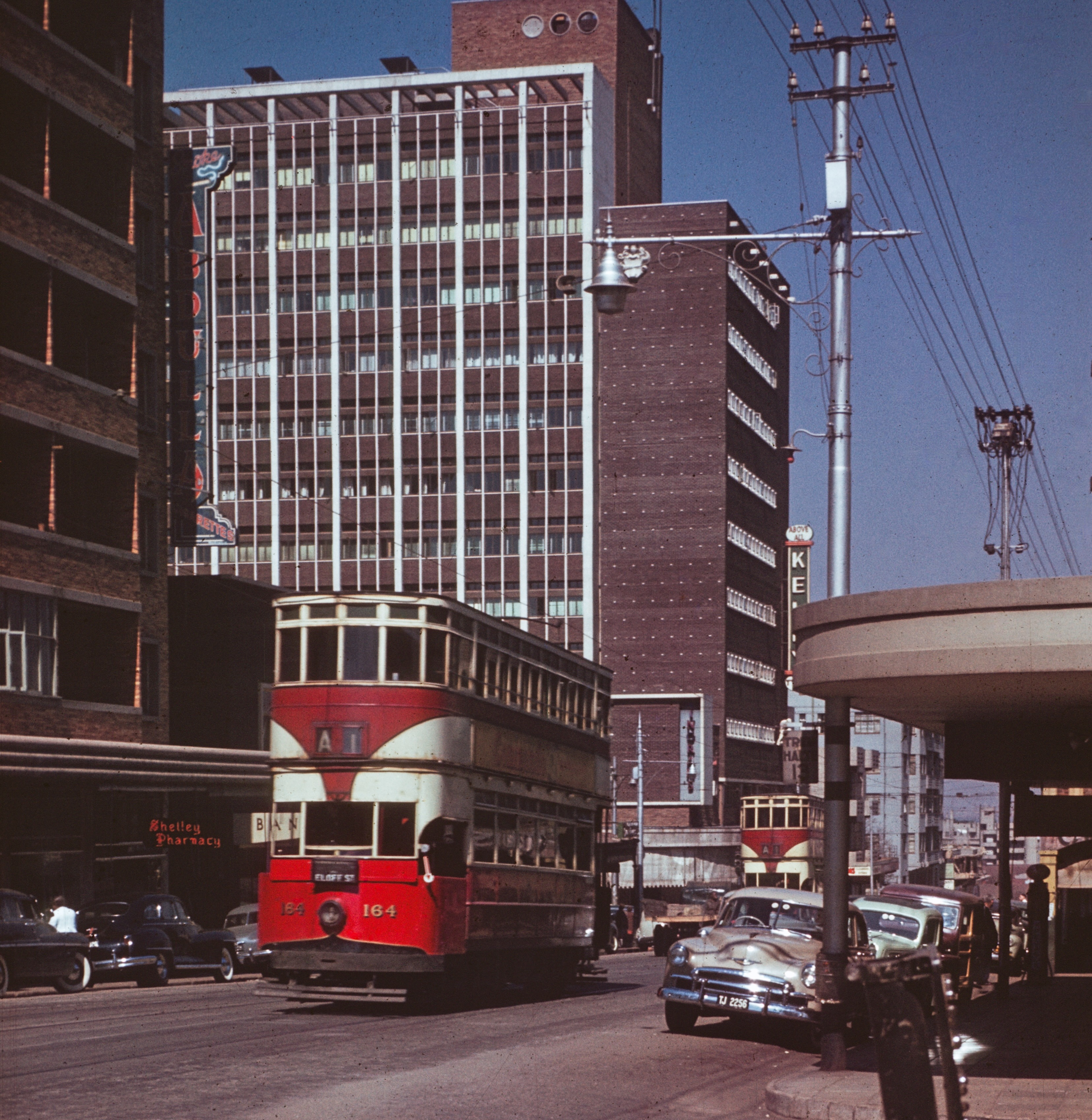
- A tram on route A1 in Hillbrow in the 1950s

Operation
- Locale: Johannesburg, South Africa

Statistics
Horsecar era: 1891–c. 1906
- Status: Closed
- Track gauge: 1,435 mm (4 ft 8 1/2 in) standard gauge
- Propulsion system: Horses
Electric tram era: 1906–1961
- Status: Closed
- Track gauge: 1,435 mm (4 ft 8 1/2 in)
- Propulsion system: Electricity

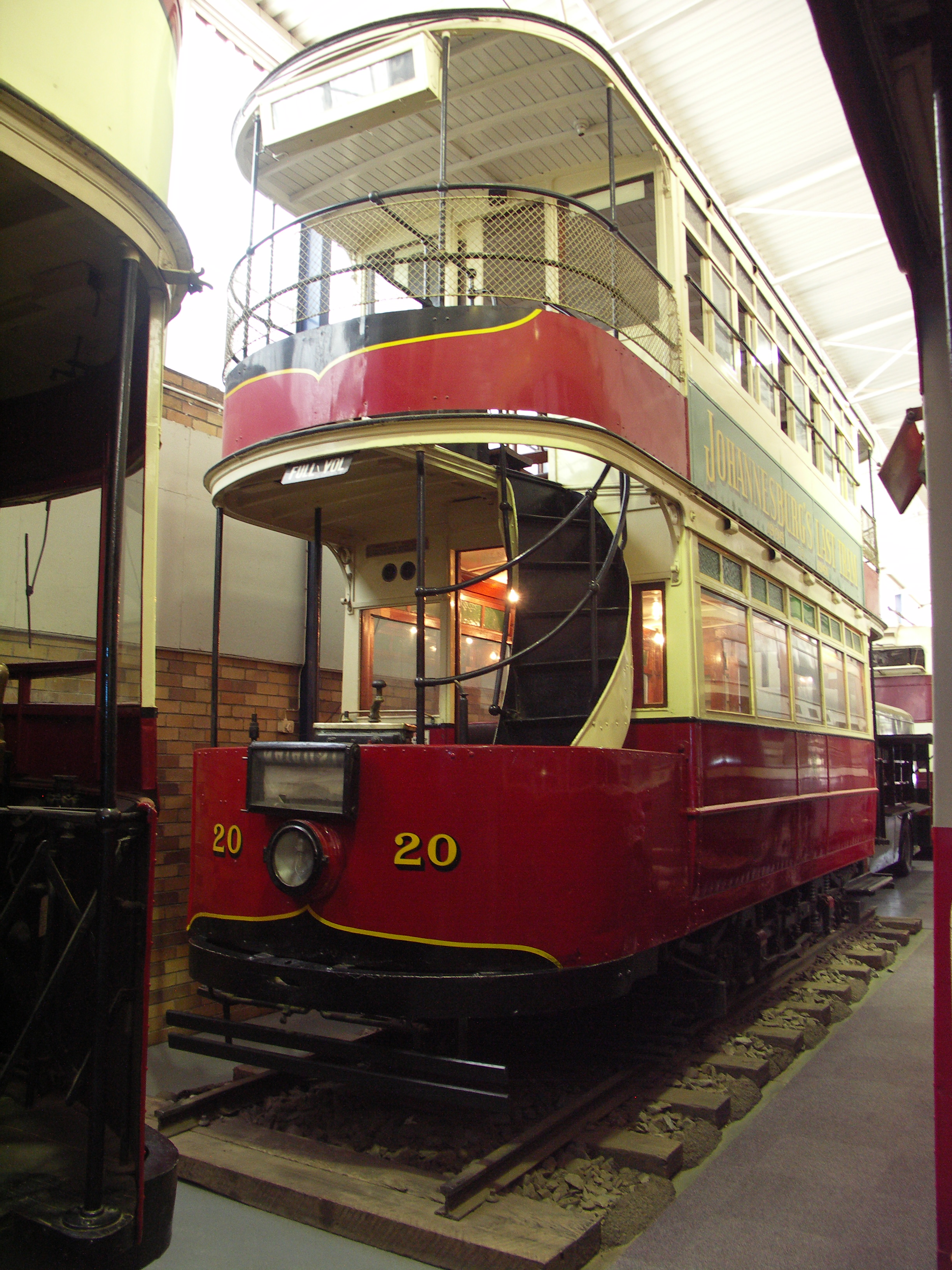
A preserved double-decker tram at James Hall Transport Museum, 2008

The Johannesburg tramway network formed part of the public transport system in Johannesburg, South Africa, for just over 70 years until the start of the 1960s.

== History ==
Opened on 2 February 1891, the network was operated initially by horsecars. From 14 February 1906, it was converted to electrical power.

Beginning on 26 August 1936, the trams were gradually supplemented by the Johannesburg trolleybus system, which was opened on that day.

However, the tramway network lasted for several more decades, until its closure on 18 March 1961. The last scheduled trams ran on the Kensington, Bez Valley and Malvern routes on the day before, and on the day of closure special commemorative trips were run. The trams on those routes were replaced by buses.

At least one rail car, car #60, has been conserved and is now exhibited at the Tramway Village in Crich (UK).

== See also ==
- History of Johannesburg
- List of town tramway systems in Africa
- Rail transport in South Africa
- Trolleybuses in Johannesburg
