= Berea station (Kentucky) =

- Louisville and Nashville Railroad Passenger Depot
- U.S. National Register of Historic Places
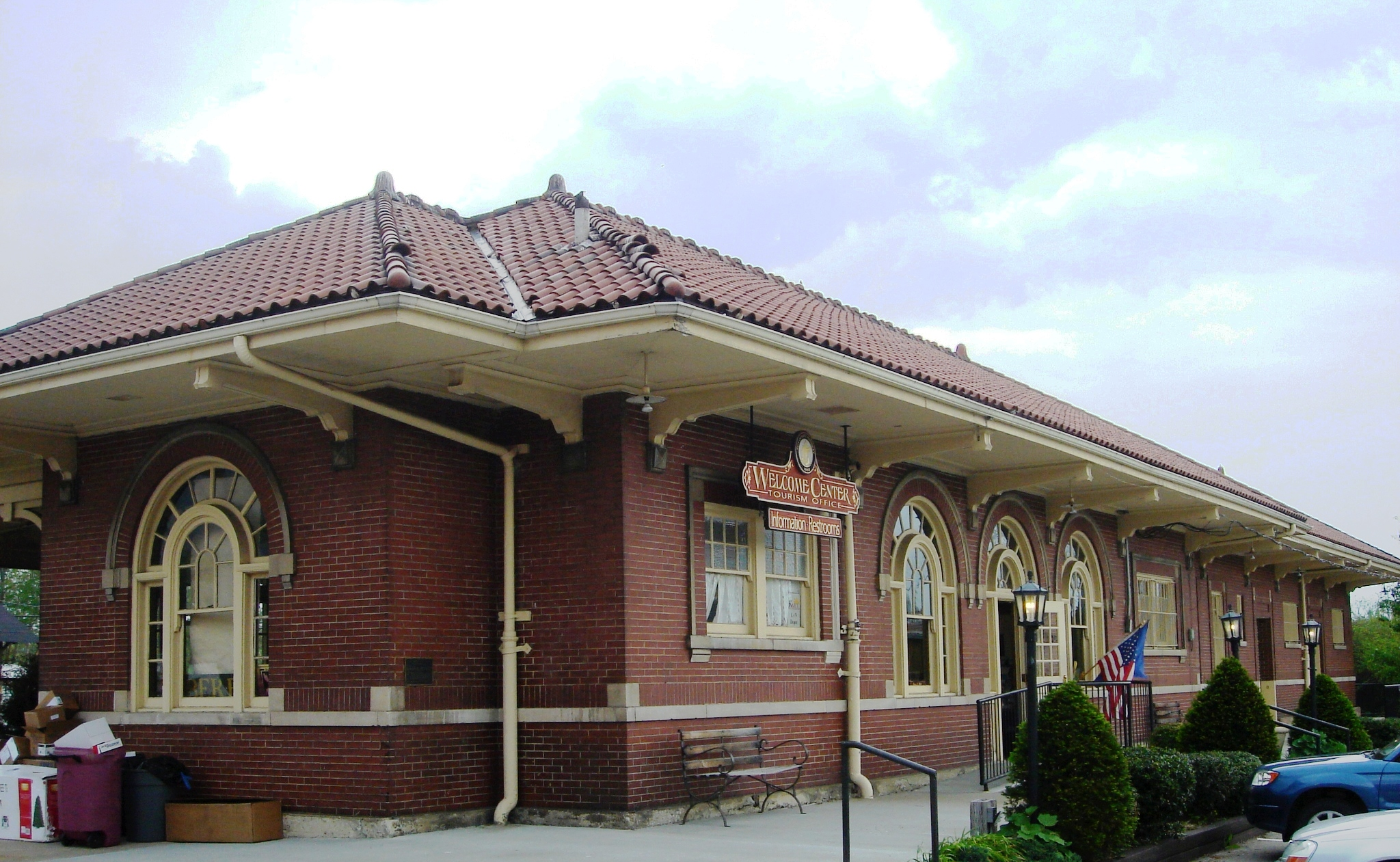
- Location: Broadway at Adams St. Berea, Kentucky
- Coordinates: 37°34′17″N 84°17′58″W
- NRHP reference No.: 75000797
- Added to NRHP: August 22, 1975

Berea Depot is a former railway station in Berea, Kentucky. The Kentucky Central Railroad acquired the site and built a small wooden station in 1883. Demolition of the old depot began in February 1905, with a new expanded building constructed that year. The modern brick depot is the third on the site and was built in 1917. Passenger service ended on March 7, 1968. It was added to the National Register of Historic Places on August 22, 1975, and subsequently purchased by the City of Berea. The depot building was renovated in the early 1980s by the non-profit group Marketing Appalachia's Traditional Community Handicrafts (MATCH), who opened a shop in an addition to the original station building.

Preceding station	Louisville and Nashville Railroad	Following station
Mayde toward Cincinnati	Cincinnati – Atlanta	Snider toward Atlanta
