= Berea Fire Station =

- The Dolls House
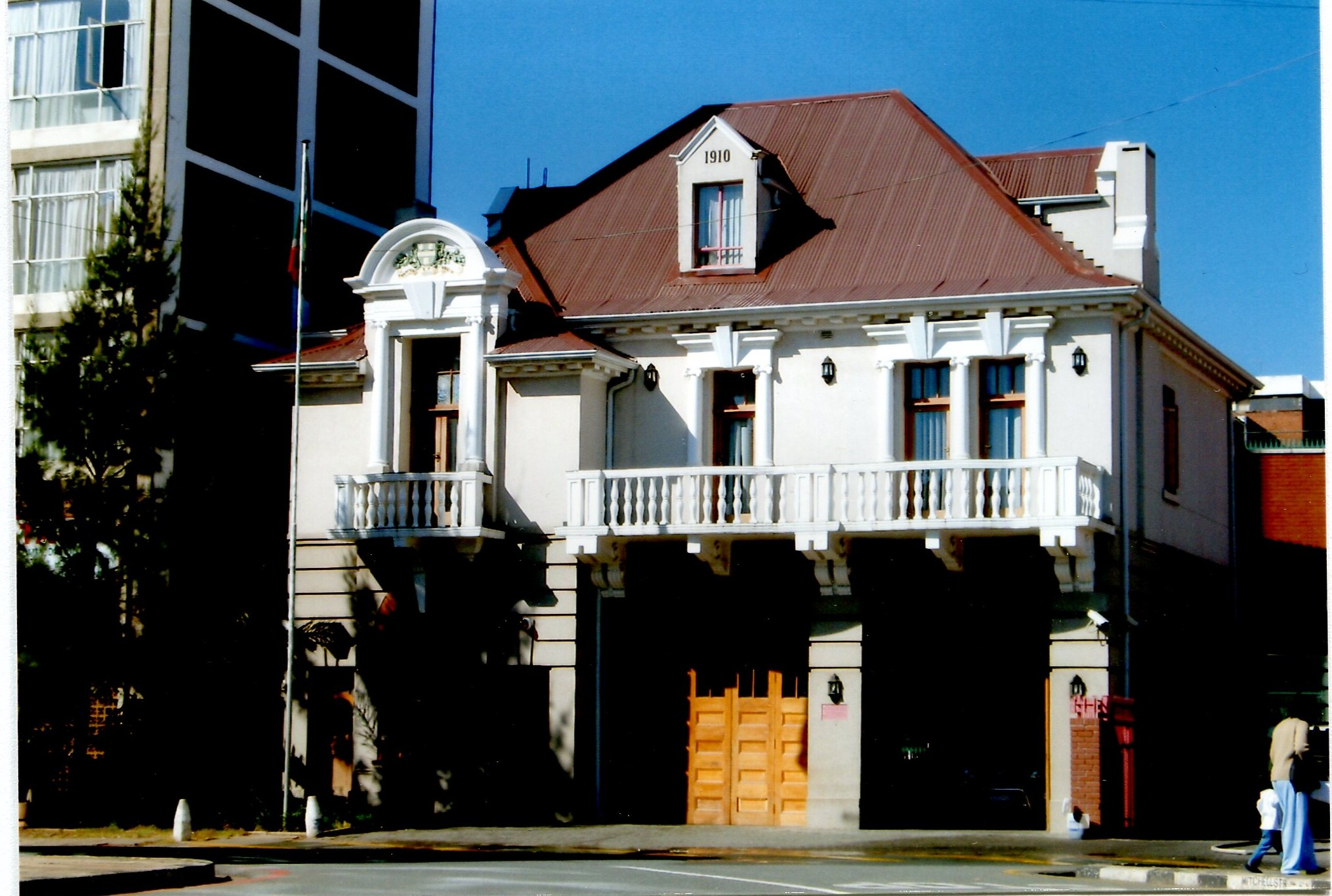

- Location within South Africa

General information
- Status: Completed
- Type: Fire Station fighting
- Location: 1 Mitchell Street, Berea, Johannesburg, South Africa
- Coordinates: 26.1824°S 28.0472°E
- Completed: 1910

Technical details
- Floor count: 3

Design and construction
- Architect: G.A Burt Andrews
- Main contractor: Dunbar & Co.

The Berea Fire station was constructed to serve the northern district of Johannesburg in 1910. It is situated in stand 927/8 on Mitchell Street in Berea. It is sometimes known as the Doll's House and it is the oldest functioning fire station in Johannesburg. The station was built in a time when Johannesburg had electricity but paraffin lamps were still providing lighting, which added to serious fire threats.

== History ==
The need for a fire brigade in Johannesburg began prior to 1900 when gold was discovered and the town became a mining town. Prospective gold miners constructed a wide range of dwellings using thatched timber, corrugated iron and canvas which were highly flammable. Johannesburg grew rapidly and increased building developments led to many fire outbreaks and the Johannesburg Consolidated Investment Company led by Barney Barnato donated stands to build the fire station.

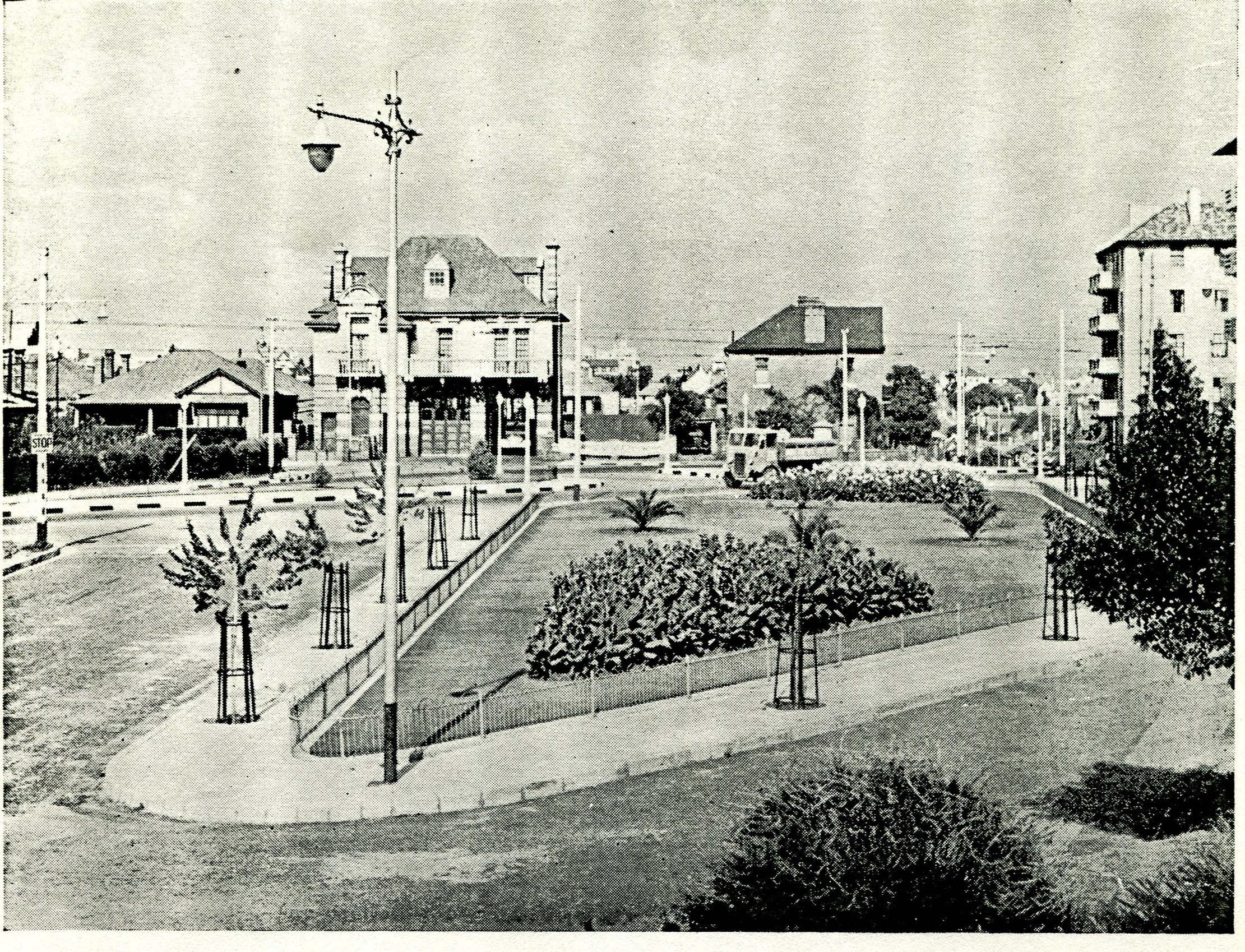
The Berea fire station in 1936

The foundation stone was laid on 15 October 1910 by Mrs D.W.Sims, mayoress of Johannesburg. She was the sister of Harry Graumann who was the mayor at that time, and the first Jewish mayor of Johannesburg. The first fire engines were horse drawn and were later motorized. After World War I petrol driven engines were used. The fireman's quarters were rebuilt around 1960. The dormer windows and garages were later additions.

== Design ==
The eclectic neo-baroque Edwardian building is two storeys high with a loft space in the hipped roof. A load-bearing construction, the walls are of plastered brickwork with timber and steel floors. The roof is corrugated iron and the windows are timber casements.

The front elevation is well proportioned creating an ordered and balanced appearance, but on a domestic scale. On consideration of the locality selected for the proposed building and the character of the neighbouring houses, it was deemed advisable to design the Fire Station in a more ornate style than had originally been contemplated. The ornate style and domestic scale of the building are the characteristics from which it derived its nickname ‘the dolls house'.

The ground floor is rusticated and all the openings have deeply moulded surrounds. The elevation is divided into three bays, one of which projects forwards and contains the entrance.

The projecting bay includes a grand window with arched pediment and pair of ionic pilasters at first floor level. Within the pediment is the original Johannesburg coat of arms carrying the inscription ‘Fortiter et Recte’ meaning ‘Resolutely and Right’.

Two projecting balconies supported on decorative corbels are provided at first floor level, one for the grand window and the other a continuous balcony in front of the other two bays. Two sets of large wooden and glass doors provide access for the fire engines. The building retains many of its original features internally, including the alarm bells.

The plan of the fire station is also based on an ordered, functional system.’ The usual engine and watch rooms, as well as the workshops, are situated on the ground floor’ (The Star 1920:6) The rooms are simply decorated and kept in a neat, orderly condition, to ensure the efficient operation of the station. The two upper storeys consist of single living quarters, including a communal mess and a games room for recreation. Six flats have since been constructed in the drill square to accommodate married fire fighters. The fire fighters are divided into two platoons which alternate 24hr shifts, hence suitable housing on the property is essential. Six houses adjacent to the station are also used for family accommodation.

== People associated with Berea Fire Station ==
Gammy de Beer (1921-2010) was the chief fire officer and head of emergency services for greater Johannesburg. Under his leadership, the fire-fighting service was recognized as one of the best in the world. Officers and city officials came from New York, London and Tokyo to study the techniques he developed for fighting fires in built-up areas. His particular expertise was in the field of fire prevention in high-rise buildings., Alex Malakalaka (2003-2017) Fire Fighter and Rescue technician.

== Heritage status ==
The Berea Fire Station was protected as a national monument in 2011 and is historically and culturally significant for the following reasons:

- Berea Fire Station is a very fine example of a small Edwardian suburban fire station with superb plasterwork
- Berea Fire Station is one of very few low-rise buildings remaining amidst the tall blocks of flats in the Berea district
- The Berea Fire Station is a landmark building on Louis Botha Avenue
- Fire stations support a functional use that is important to local communities and so Berea Fire Station has social significance
