= La Rochelle, Johannesburg =

La Rochelle
- Location within Gauteng Location within South Africa
- Coordinates: 26.2359°S 28.0544°E
- Country: South Africa
- Province: Gauteng
- Municipality: City of Johannesburg
- Main Place: Johannesburg
- Established: 1895

Area
  - Total: 0.83 km^{2} (0.32 sq mi)

Population (2011)
  - Total: 5,131
  - Density: 6,200/km^{2} (16,000/sq mi)

Racial makeup (2011)
  - Black African: 87.7%
  - Coloured: 4.6%
  - Indian/Asian: 1.0%
  - White: 6.7%
  - Other: 0.1%

First languages (2011)
  - Zulu: 18.6%
  - English: 16.1%
  - Xhosa: 9.5%
  - Tsonga: 6.0%
  - Other: 49.7%
- Time zone: UTC+2 (SAST)
- Postal code (street): 2190

La Rochelle is a suburb of Johannesburg, South Africa. South of the Johannesburg CBD, the suburbs of Turffontein and Rosettenville lie to its south. It is located in Region F of the City of Johannesburg Metropolitan Municipality.

== History ==
Prior to the discovery of gold on the Witwatersrand in 1886, the suburb lay on land on one of the original farms called Turffontein. It became a suburb in 1895, and named after the estate owned by Josias Eduard de Villiers and the French town of La Rochelle.
