= Dmitry Voronenko =

Kyrgyzstani-Ukrainian serial killer and rapist (born 1971)

- Born: Dmitry Petrovich Voronenko; 29 July 1971 (age 55); Kök-Janggak, Osh Region, Kirghiz SSR
- Other names: "The Petersburg Maniac" "The Petersburg Strangler"
- Conviction: Murder
- Penalty: Life imprisonment

Details
- Victims: 4
- Span of crimes: 2006–2007
- Country: Russia
- State: St. Petersburg
- Date apprehended: 24 May 2007
- Imprisoned at: Polar Owl, Kharp, Yamalo-Nenets Autonomous Okrug

Dmitry Petrovich Voronenko (Russian: Дми́трий Петро́вич Вороне́нко, Ukrainian: Дмитро Петрович Вороненко; born 29 July 1971), known as The Petersburg Maniac (Russian: Петербургский маньяк), is a Kyrgyzstani-Ukrainian serial killer, who killed four girls and young women in St. Petersburg between 2006 and 2007.

== Early life ==
Voronenko was born in the Osh Region into the family of an electrician and a kindergarten teacher. In his childhood, he liked to choke cats and dogs. After graduating from the 10th grade, he did not have a permanent job. In 1987, Voronenko moved to the Ukrainian city of Krivyi Rih, where he graduated from the vocational school for the welder specialty.

In 1989 Voronenko was sentenced to three years of correctional labour at construction sites in the Crimea for theft. Shortly before his release, he stole a bottle of brandy and a phone from his shift manager, for which he was added another two years of correctional labour. In 1997–1999, he received a suspended sentence on three occasions for "causing serious harm to health in excess of the limits of self-defence" and theft. In 2004, he was sentenced to five years in prison for two confirmed rapes in 2000 and 2001, most of the punishment being absorbed by the term of stay under investigation. In March 2005, just over three years and three months from the date of arrest, Voronenko was released on parole for good behaviour.

The rapist was to be deported to the place of citizenship - Ukraine, but the supervising authorities did not pay proper attention to Voronenko, so after his last arrest, numerous accusations were made against certain officials, but none were held viable as direct accomplices to the serial killer.

== Murders ==
Voronenko attacked girls and young women, preferring blondes, about 150 centimetres in height.

On 25 August 2006, he raped a 17-year-old girl on Loni Golikova Street. The victim managed to survive the ordeal.

On 8 December 2006, in the basement of a house on Stachek Avenue, he committed his first murder. The victim was 11-year-old Lida Pogodina, whom he raped, killed and then hid the body in a garbage heap.

On 28 January 2007, on Polyukstrovsky Avenue, he killed 19-year-old Katya Fedotova. As it later turned out, Voronenko had suggested that he take the woman to the bus. The girl's body was found only after a month.

On 4 March 2007, he raped and killed 20-year-old Alena Gnatyuk, a student of the Institute of Water Transport. The killer kidnapped her from the "Chyornaya Rechka" metro station, dragged her into the basement of a house on Kolomyazhsky Avenue, raped and strangled her.

On 21 May 2007, in the basement of a house on Bolshaya Raznochinnaya Street, he committed the last murder. The victim was 12-year-old Lena Boyko, with the modus operandi being the same - she was raped, followed by strangulation.

== Arrest, investigation and trial ==
According to the testimony of witnesses, a facial composite of the killer was drawn up. At the disposal of the authorities were recordings from external surveillance cameras at one of the murder sites. As a result, 863 people previously convicted of sexual crimes were tested. During the search, information was received about Voronenko. His address was traced, and on 24 May 2007, he was ambushed and arrested. At first, he was suspected only in the last murder, but he subsequently confessed to the previous three. Forensic psychiatric examination recognized Voronenko as insane. The killer did not regret his deeds. These were Voronenko's last words at his trial:

... To say something to me is meaningless, nobody understands me anyway, you can publicly execute me on Palace Square. Anyway, this will not change anything. I still can not understand why it did...

At the trial, the parents of the murdered girls and the prosecutor demanded the death penalty for Voronenko, but the court did not consider it possible to make such a verdict due to the moratorium on the death penalty, and on March 20, 2008, the St. Petersburg City Court sentenced him to life imprisonment. Relatives of the victims appealed to the Russian Supreme Court demanding the death penalty, but the verdict was left unchanged. Voronenko is currently serving his sentence in the "Polar Owl" penitentiary.

== In the media ==
- Documentary film Blood on the Neva, from the series Out of law.
- Documentary film To sentence to the highest measure from the series Detective Stories directed by Vakhtang Mikeladze.
- Documentary Early release...for a maniac from the series Life sentenced, directed by Vakhtang Mikeladze.

== See also ==
- List of Russian serial killers
