= Eva Merkacheva =

Russian journalist and human rights activist

- Ева Меркачёва
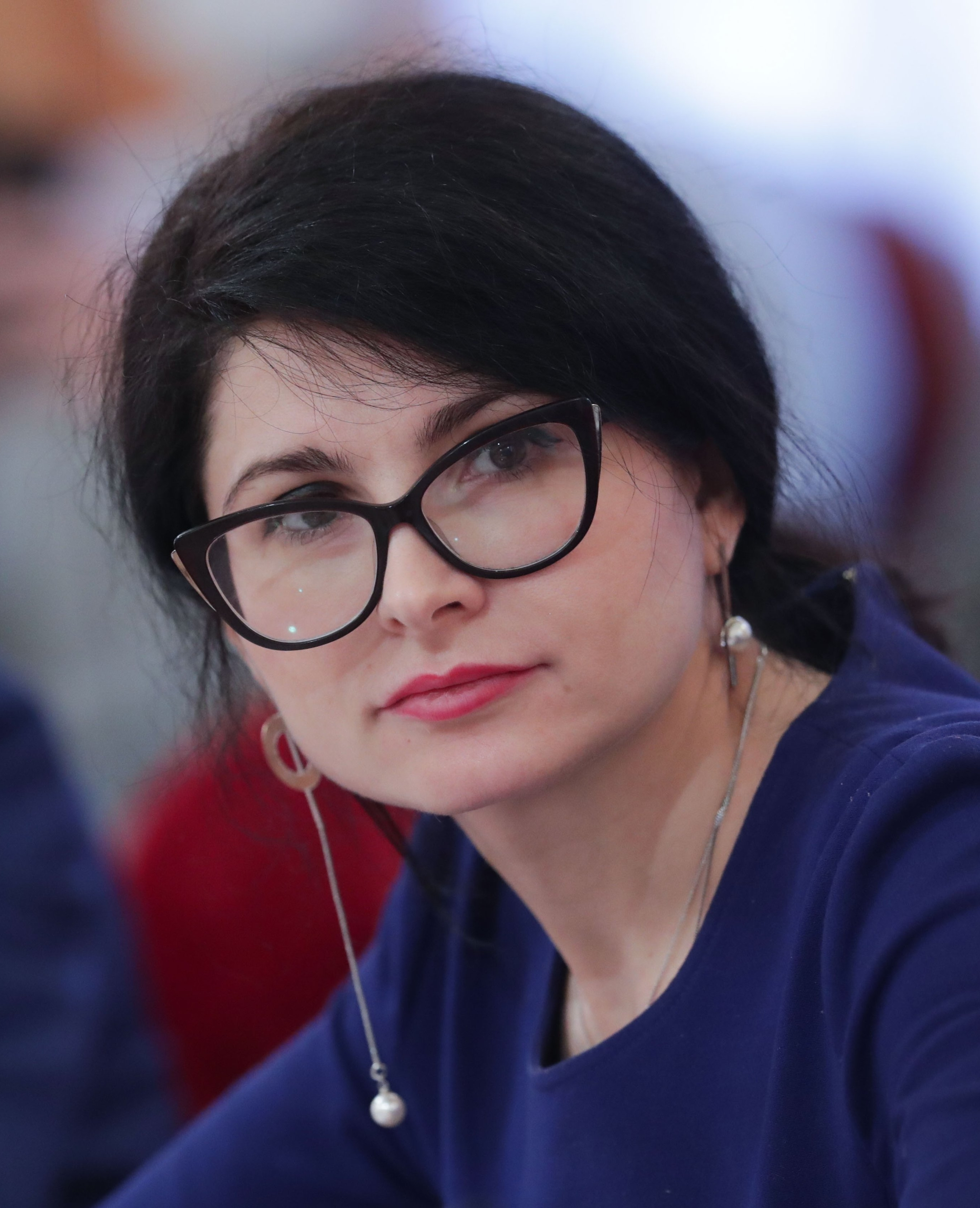
- Merkacheva in 2022
- Born: Eva Mikhailovna Merkacheva; 15 October 1978 (age 48); Bryansk, Russian SFSR, Soviet Union
- Education: Moscow State University
- Occupations: Russian journalist, writer, human rights activist, radio presenter

Eva Mikhailovna Merkacheva (Russian: Меркачёва, Ева Михайловна; born 15 October 1978) is a Russian journalist, author, and human rights activist.

She has been a member of the Presidential Council for Civil Society and Human Rights of the Russian Federation since 2018. She is a member of the Moscow Union of Journalists, the Union of Journalists of Russia, and the Union of Litterateurs. She is a laureate of the Russian Government Prize in Mass Media (2016), a two-time laureate of the Foreign Intelligence Service of the Russian Federation Prize (2017 and 2025), and a laureate of the Supreme Legal Prize «Themis» (2025).

== Biography ==
Born on October 15, 1978, in Bryansk.

She graduated with honors from the Faculty of Journalism at Lomonosov Moscow State University.

=== Journalistic career ===
Since 2003, she has worked as a journalist and columnist for the newspaper Moskovskij Komsomolets. She specializes in investigative reporting, much of which has led to the initiation of high-profile criminal cases. A recognized expert on prison-related topics, she has written a series of reports from some of Russia's most well-known correctional facilities, including Kresty, Vladimir Central, and colonies for those serving life sentences — among them Polar Owl (the village of Kharp, Yamalo-Nenets Autonomous Okrug) and Vologodsky Pyatak (Ognenny Island, Vologda Oblast). She won the National Press Prize «Iskra» in 2013 in the category «Most Scandalous Journalistic Story of the Year» for her article about a plane packed with cash at Sheremetyevo Airport. In 2015, she received the Moscow Mayor's Prize for a series of anti-corruption investigations. Her investigative series on life behind bars led to the dismissal of a number of penitentiary system officials.

In 2012, Merkacheva took part in the first journalist exchange program between Russia and the United States, made possible through the work of the Bilateral Russian-American Presidential Commission (established by decision of the presidents of Russia and the United States). As part of the exchange program, the Moskovsky Komsomolets journalist served as a correspondent for the Pittsburgh Post-Gazette.

On January 13, 2017, Merkacheva became a laureate of the Russian Government Prize in the field of mass media, awarded for a series of publications addressing problems in Russia's penitentiary system. On February 9, 2017, she received the «Golden Pen of Russia» award, established by the Union of Journalists of Russia, in recognition of her series of publications on the protection of the rights of detainees and prisoners.

In 2017, her book Crimes and Secrets of Modern Russia was published, based on her investigative work involving such figures as singer Alexander Rosenbaum, crime world leader Shakro, Doctor Lisa, the heirs of journalist Nikolai Ozerov and Semyon Budyonny, and other prominent individuals.

In 2020, she became a laureate of the Union of Journalists of Russia's «Solidarity» Prize. Together with the prize's co-laureate — WikiLeaks founder Julian Assange — she asked the organizers to donate her award money to the families of journalists who had been killed.

In 2021, together with Ekaterina Reifert and Alexander Khurudzhi, she became a co-host of the weekly program Human Rights Defenders on Sputnik Radio. In 2023, two of her books were published: Cell Reports and Life Parables and Who Has It Good Behind Bars in Russia. Cell Reports and Life Parables is a collection of novellas-parables about the lives of people serving sentences in Russian prisons — Merkacheva's debut in fiction writing. In Who Has It Good Behind Bars in Russia, she profiles Moscow's largest pre-trial detention centers, a number of Russian correctional colonies, and the conditions of confinement within them.

In 2024, the sequel to the High-Profile Cases series was released: A Purely Russian Crime: The Most Notorious and Mysterious Criminal Cases of the 18th-20th Centuries, featuring legal proceedings ranging from trials of sorcerers to criminal cases during the Siege of Leningrad. That same year, the publisher Veche released her book The Feat of Intelligence Officers: Conversations with Legends, a collection of interviews with heroes of Russian intelligence and their families.

In 2025, Alpina Publisher released Merkacheva's new book I'm Coming to Find You, a collection of stories about Russian serial killers. The book was included in the list of the most compelling works of 2025 according to the «LUCH» rating, based on Yandex Books data on reader completion rates.

Since 2022, Eva Merkacheva has hosted the author's program Historical Thursday with Eva Merkacheva on MK TV.

=== Human Rights Work ===
In 2010, she joined the working group of the State Duma Committee on Public Associations and Religious Organizations. Since 2012, she has served as Deputy Chairman of the Moscow Public Monitoring Commission (PMC), which oversees places of involuntary detention. She was nominated to three successive terms on the PMC by the Moscow Union of Journalists. In 2022, Merkacheva completed her third term on the PMC, which is the maximum permitted.

In 2015, she gained widespread public attention in connection with being granted witness status in the case of Boris Nemtsov's murder, as well as for her series of publications on conditions in Moscow's prisons and pre-trial detention centers. On March 12, 2015, Merkacheva was questioned at the Main Investigative Department of the Investigative Committee of Russia in Moscow.

Investigators became interested in human rights defenders Merkacheva and her colleague Andrei Babushkin after the two visited suspects in the Nemtsov murder case at a detention facility, where the suspects reported being subjected to torture.

On December 3, 2018, she was appointed to the Presidential Council for Civil Society and Human Rights.

At the meeting with the President of the Russian Federation on December 10, 2024, Eva Merkacheva proposed expanding the use of jury trials, which she argued could help compensate for the declining quality of investigative work and evidentiary standards. In her words, juries deliver acquittals in 25% of cases, compared to an overall acquittal rate of under 1%. She proposed extending the range of criminal offenses eligible for jury trial, including Articles 132 and 228 of the Criminal Code and economic crimes. In her view, this would also require increasing juror compensation and introducing a mechanism to protect jury verdicts from prosecutorial challenge. She further proposed reviving the practice of releasing defendants under personal surety, combined with stronger enforcement of the obligations assumed by the guarantor. Additionally, she asked the President to issue another pardon for women convicted of non-violent offenses who have young children.

On October 17, 2025, Eva Merkacheva was awarded the Supreme Legal Prize «Themis» in the category «Human Rights Activity».

=== Public Activities ===
In July 2018, Eva Merkacheva launched, for the first time in the history of the Russian penitentiary system, an experimental yoga program for inmates at Moscow Pre-Trial Detention Center No. 6. To help prisoners learn yoga techniques, Merkacheva and well-known trainer Aleksei Merkulov developed a special manual, Yoga for Prisoners.

She has been a member of the Public Board for Press Complaints since 2018.

In 2019, Eva Merkacheva, in her capacity as Deputy Chairman of the Moscow PMC, organized — with the assistance of the Federal Penitentiary Service — the first and only football match held at Butyrka Prison, featuring well-known footballer Pavel Mamayev, who was then in pre-trial detention on charges of assault. A football pitch was constructed on the grounds of the detention center for the occasion. The match took place on February 14.

On December 22, 2021, she was removed from the Public Council of the Federal Penitentiary Service, where she had worked since 2016. As reported by the television channel Rain, this occurred after Merkacheva had informed Putin about the use of torture in correctional colonies.
