= Alexander and Viktor Zhizhich =

Convicted Russian-Belarusian serial killers

Alexander Zhizhich
- Born: Alexander Viktorovich Zhizhich; 1979 (age 46–47); Byelorussian SSR
- Conviction: Murder x5
- Penalty: Life imprisonment

Details
- Victims: 5
- Span of crimes: January – October 2003
- Country: Russia
- States: Vologda, Arkhangelsk
- Date apprehended: 29 October 2003
- Imprisoned at: Polar Owl, Kharp, Yamalo-Nenets Autonomous Okrug

Viktor Zhizhich
- Born: Viktor Viktorovich Zhizhich; 1976 (age 49–50); RSFSR
- Conviction: Murder x3
- Penalty: 23 years imprisonment

Details
- Victims: 3
- Span of crimes: January – October 2003
- Country: Russia
- State: Vologda
- Date apprehended: 29 October 2003

Alexander Viktorovich Zhizhich (Russian: Александр Викторович Жижич; born 1979) and Viktor Viktorovich Zhizhich (Russian: Виктор Викторович Жижич; born 1976) are Belarusian-Russian serial killers of Polish descent who murdered three people in the Vologda Oblast between January and October 2003. Alexander Zhizhich committed two additional murders in Arkhangelsk. The brothers were found guilty after trial, with Alexander receiving a life sentence and Viktor sentenced to 23 years imprisonment.

== Crimes ==
The Zhizhich brothers were unemployed vagrants who had been travelling around Russia for several years by train. Usually, when conductors found them riding without a ticket, they were dropped off at the nearest station, where they sought shelter from good samaritans before leaving the next day by train.

On 7 January 2003, the brothers found themselves in the town of Sokol. After disembarking from the train, they came across a 74-year-old pensioner, and the trio struck up a conversation. The brothers claimed to have been mugged, with both personal documents and all their money stolen in the process. They begged the woman for bread so as not to starve. The woman went to a nearby shop, bought them some bread, and invited them to her home, where she provided them with a room.

Unbeknownst to her, on the first night, Alexander and Viktor noticed a small color television in her bedroom, which they determined to steal. Their conversation was overheard by the woman through the walls, but this failed to prevent them from executing their plan. The pair grabbed a knife and a small wooden hammer from the kitchen, entered the pensioner's room, and punched, kicked, and beat her to death. After killing the woman, the brothers collected the woman's belongings, including the television, a pair of glasses, clothing, rice, sugar, and curtains, totalling 6,000 rubles. To cover their tracks, they scattered dry grass and newspapers around the house and set them on fire, burning the house to the ground.

Several months later, on 22 June, Alexander Zhizhich found himself in the village of Lukhtonga, Arkhangelsk, where he befriended a young woman and her male roommate. To celebrate their new acquaintance, Zhizhich's new friends organized a party at their apartment, which lasted throughout the day. However, in his drunken state, Zhizhich demanded the man to disassemble the television and give him the speakers, which the man refused to do. Angered, Zhizhich beat both the residents with a stool and due to their intoxicated states, they could not defend themselves. After making sure that neither of them was moving, Alexander grabbed a scratch awl and stabbed both victims. He then disassembled the television, stole its parts, and fled the village. When authorities found the victims, the woman had long succumbed to her injuries, but her roommate was still living. However, he died a few weeks later from his injuries, providing no clue about the killer. The loot from this crime later would be assessed at just 130 rubles.

The brothers' final and bloodiest crime occurred on 27 October. Leaving the train at Yavenge Station in Vozhegodsky District, they came across a local couple, to whom they recounted their stolen documents story. The couple invited them to their house for drinks and they all travelled to Yekimovskaya. After all of them became drunk, the couple questioned parts of the brothers' story, to which the brothers reacted by attacking them with their hands, fists, and any weapons they could find to assault their victims. After killing the wife, Viktor held the husband down and forced him to watch Alexander strip the woman's corpse and shove an empty glass bottle into her vagina, before smashing it with a knife. The brothers then beat the man to death. They rummaged through the house, stole a hydraulic pump, an electric saw, several lightbulbs, a wall lamp, a clock, and some food, which they packed into their bags and then quickly left.

== Arrest, trial, and imprisonment ==
Later that day, other villagers in Yekimovskaya decided to check on the married couple, as they had failed to go to the store for bread as they did every morning. They went to the house and discovered the walls covered with blood, the furniture was broken, and their neighbours' bruised and mutilated bodies on the floor. The authorities were notified, and witnesses told them they had seen the victims with two unfamiliar men the day before, with the pair later leaving the house with loaded luggage. Two days later, the brothers were detained in the Vozhegorodsky district by a policeman who found them suspicious and asked them for their documents. When they failed to provide identification, he arrested them. On the way to the police station, Alexander confessed to killing the spouses in Yekimovskaya. While being questioned, he additionally confessed to the three other murders, directing them to the crime scenes and explaining how they had done it.

The brothers were charged with several crimes, including the five murders, causing grievous bodily harm, robbery, and property damage. While they were housed in separate detention centers before trial, Alexander tried to send a note to his brother, instructing him to deny the Sokol murder and implicate another man, but the note was found by authorities and later used by prosecutors at trial. During the trial, the pair were seen to smile at the victims' family members while hearing their crimes being described in court. In the end, both admitted to the Yekimovskaya double murder and Alexander to the Lukhtonga killings, but both denied committing the murder in Sokol.

As a result, this became a subject of skepticism by some jurors, who argued that there was not enough evidence to charge them with the first murder, as most of it had been burned in the fire. Nevertheless, in the end, both Alexander and Viktor were found guilty on all charges, with the former being sentenced to life imprisonment and the latter to 23 years imprisonment. At trial, it was remarked that had it not been for the country's moratorium on the death penalty, the younger brother most likely would have been sentenced to death and executed. Both brothers were sent to separate strict regime colonies. Alexander is currently incarcerated in the Polar Owl Colony at Kharp village in the Arctic north of Siberia.

== See also ==
- List of Russian serial killers
