= Sergey Khalmetov =

Russian serial killer and rapist (born 1978)

- Born: Sergey Baltabayevich Khalmetov; 1978 (age 47–48); Kezsky District, Udmurt ASSR, RSFSR
- Conviction: Murder x4
- Penalty: 10 years imprisonment (2008); Life imprisonment (2019)

Details
- Victims: 4+
- Span of crimes: 2002–2007
- Country: Russia
- States: Perm, Udmurtia
- Date apprehended: 2007 (first arrest); November 2017 (second arrest)
- Imprisoned at: Polar Owl, Kharp, Yamalo-Nenets Autonomous Okrug

Sergey Baltabayevich Khalmetov (Russian: Сергей Балтабаевич Халметов; born 1978) is a Russian serial killer and rapist who murdered at least four children and young women in Perm and Udmurtia from 2002 to 2007. He achieved notoriety following his second arrest in 2017 for the cold case murder dating back to 2002, and is currently under investigation for other crimes.

Khalmetov was later convicted and sentenced to life imprisonment.

== Early life ==
Very little is known about Khalmetov's early life. Born in 1978 in the Kezsky District of the Udmurt ASSR, he married after finishing school and, together with his wife and child, moved to the village of Cheptsa, where he worked as a trackman on a railroad. At the time, he was regarded positively by friends and relatives.

== Murders ==
=== Murder of Valentina Shklyeva ===
Khalmetov's first known murder occurred on 30 September 2002, with the victim being 18-year-old Valentina Shklyeva, a fellow villager from Cheptsa. She had graduated school that summer and enrolled at the Perm Pedagogical College, moving into a local hostel. In late September, she returned to Cheptsa to spend the weekend with her parents, and on 30 September, at half past five in the morning, Shklyeva got on the No. 0662 "Belesino-Perm-2" train to travel back to Perm. While traveling in one of the carriages, she encountered Khalmetov, with whom she engaged in conversation for several hours.

According to his own claims, on the afternoon of 30 September, Khalmetov got off the train with her in Perm, after which he offered to drink beer, to which the girl allegedly agreed. He claimed that after getting off at the platform of the Kurya railway station, he and Shklyeva went to the forest, where they talked and drank beer for some time, after which he offered to have sex with her and sexually harassed her. Shklyeva resisted his advances, after which Khalmetov beat, raped and strangled her to death.

After the murder, Khalmetov dug a shallow grave and buried Shklyeva's body in there, leaving the scene without being seen. When Valentina did not arrive on the appointed day for her studies, the young woman's parents organized a large-scale search for her. Authorities interviewed college professors, fellow students and acquaintances. In an attempt to retrace his daughter's steps, Shklyeva's father came to the railway station several days in a row and boarded the same train. With his daughter's photo in his hands, he asked passengers and conductors about her possible whereabouts. Her mother Nadezhda contacted the Acting Minister of Internal Affairs, after which the girl was put on a federal wanted list.

=== Investigation of Khalmetov ===
While investigating Shklyeva's disappearance, law enforcement officers found several witnesses who stated that they had seen the young in the company of Sergey Khalmetov on 30 September. He was brought in for questioning, and while Khalmetov admitted that he had traveled on the train with her, he claimed that she moved to another carriage and that he never saw her again.

Since the woman's body was not found and there was no evidence to arrest him, the authorities released him. In order to avert suspicion, Khalmetov went to her parents' home and tried to convince them that he had no involvement whatsoever.

Nine years later, in February 2012, Shklyeva's parents received a letter from a girl named Galina, who claimed that she and Valentina were held in sexual slavery for several years and that they later escaped. She went on to claim that, along with her 3-year-old daughter named Daria, she was currently residing in Pskov. The letter was given to investigators, who concluded that it was written by a "mentally unhealthy fellow villager" and dismissed any further investigation into this lead.

=== Further murders and first arrest ===
In the summer of 2006, Khalmetov randomly came across two girls, aged 13 and 12, respectively, who had run away from their homes and gone to the Perm-2 train station. After talking with them for a bit, Khalmetov offered them to spend the night at his house. Instead, he lured them to a deserted house in the Dzerzhinsky City District in Perm, where he raped them under the threat of death and then strangled them. While investigating the double murder, investigators found traces of the killer's semen on the girls' bodies and isolated DNA, but this did not lead to an arrest at the time.

Khalmetov committed his final known murder sometime in 2007, when he murdered a 40-year-old pregnant woman in the village of Balezino in Udmurtia. A few days later, thanks to a witness' testimony, he was arrested and charged with this crime. In the following months, his guilt was conclusively proven and Khalmetov was later convicted of rape and murder, receiving a 10-year sentence. At trial, he admitted responsibility for the crime, claiming that he killed the woman because they had some kind of disagreement.

While serving his sentence, Khalmetov was considered a good inmate by the prison administration. In the mid-2010s, a blood sample was taken by Khalmetov, from which DNA was isolated and entered into the federal database. After serving more than 8 years in prison, Khalmetov was granted parole on 1 August 2016 and released from prison.

=== Second arrest and trial ===
While investigating the double murder that Khalmetov committed in the summer of 2006, DNA was isolated from the perpetrator and entered into a federal database. In mid-2017, an analysis of the samples revealed that Khalmetov's genotypic profile, leading to him being put on a wanted list. After his release from prison, Khalmetov divorced his wife and started living on the streets, making money via odd jobs. In November of that year, investigators established his whereabouts in Udmurtia and arrested him.

Upon learning that he faced the possibility of a life sentence, Khalmetov offered to make a deal with the prosecutor's office. In exchange for a reduced sentence, he wrote an affidavit in which he confessed to killing Valentina Shklyeva. In the fall of 2018, he was taken several times under escort to the murder scene for an investigative experiment in which he demonstrated how he carried out the murder, but was unable to locate her body. Khalmetov himself struggled to locate the exact burial site, and since a road had been built on the site and other structures had been paved over, investigators were unable to locate the body. Due to this, investigators canceled the plea agreement. At the subsequent trial, Khalmetov was convicted of killing the two girls and sentenced to life imprisonment.

== Prosecution for Shklyeva murder ==
Following his conviction, Khalmetov was transferred to the Polar Owl Colony to serve his sentence. In 2024, the investigation into the Shklyeva murder was reopened, as a result of which Khalmetov left the Polar Owl and was transferred to Perm Krai to participate in another investigative experiment. In that summer, he was again taken to the supposed burial site, where he showed the officers how he strangled the girl using a mannequin. Taking into account his confession and the analysis of his actions, investigators concluded that his testimony was reliable and suitable for prosecution.

In the aftermath of the indictment, Khalmetov suddenly recanted his testimony and proclaimed that he was innocent. A few days later, he was able to conceal a small sharp object after prison guards failed to properly search him, allowing him to cut out his confession from the criminal case, which he brought back to his cell and subsequently destroyed. He was subsequently charged with obstruction of justice, with Khalmetov objecting to the charges, claiming that he only did because the confession was supposedly obtained under duress.

=== Second trial ===
Khalmetov's trial began on 16 September 2024. Throughout the proceedings, he insisted on his innocence, but also made cynical remarks aimed at the victim and her parents. While he reluctantly admitted to being acquainted with her, he gave different explanations about what had happened. Initially, Khalmetov claimed that Shklyeva was a promiscuous alcoholic who had willing sexual relations with him, which her parents vehemently denied. He then changed his story, claiming that the pair had met a group of young men on the train and stopped on the "Promishlenny Uchastok" platform. There, the young men waited on the platform while Khalmetov and Shklyeva had sex in the nearby forest. Once they were done, Khalmetov left, leaving Shklyeva to return to the group of young women, one of whom supposedly was the real killer. At one of the court sessions, Shklyeva's father became ill after hearing the accusations against his daughter, after which he completely stopped attending.

At one point, Shklyeva's mother was in the courtroom before the judge and most of the participants had entered, during which she supposedly looked at Khalmetov and pleaded with him to at least return a single bone from her daughter's body. According to her, Khalmetov muttered out an answer that she was unable to clearly hear, but to her, it sounded like he said that if found guilty, she wouldn't get anything at all.

On 29 October, Khalmetov was found guilty of the murder, after which an additional 9 years were added to his sentence. At his sentencing, he refused to admit guilt to either the Shklyeva murder or the double murder, claiming sole responsibility for the killing the pregnant woman in 2007. After his conviction, he filed an appeal against the verdict, but it was denied. The head investigator of the case, Dmitry Popov, later released a statement in which he reiterated that while the victim's body has not been found, there was sufficient evidence for conviction.

=== Obstruction of justice charges ===
In December 2024, a trial was held on charges of obstruction of justice. At the trial, Khalmetov admitted that he had cut out the sheets of the criminal case from page 71 to 79, which contained his confession and the transcript of the interrogation. He folded the cut sheets into his A4 notebook, after which he burned them in his cell in the floor toilet. He said that he had a small sharpened plate in his notebook.

At the end of January 2025, Khalmetov was found guilty of destroying evidence in connection to the murder of Valentina Shklyeva, after which the Leninsky City District Court in Perm sentenced him to 200 hours of forced labor as punishment. Khalmetov almost immediately filed an appeal, claiming that the sentence was "absurd" given his life sentence. His appeal was upheld, after which the appellate court overturned the verdict and sent it for review.

On 27 March 2025, he was found guilty of all charges a second time, but the court took into account his confession of guilt and apparent remorse as mitigating circumstances. As a result, he was given 180 hours of forced labor.

== See also ==
- List of Russian serial killers
- List of murder convictions without a body
