= Sob (river) =

River in Siberia, Russia

Sob Собь
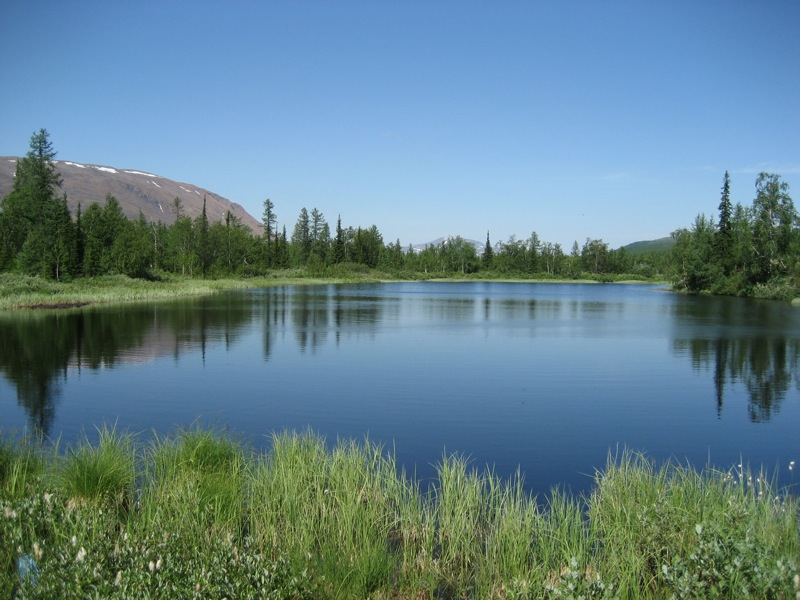
- View of the Sob north of Kharp

- Mouth location in Yamalo-Nenets Autonomous Okrug, Russia

Location
- Country: Russia

Physical characteristics
- Source: Polar Urals
  - coordinates: 66°57′01″N 65°13′39″E
- Mouth: Ob
  - location: Katravozh
  - coordinates: 66°19′24″N 66°09′43″E
- Length: 185 km (115 mi) (304 km (189 mi))
- Basin size: 5,890 km^{2} (2,270 sq mi)
- Discharge
  - average: 50 m^{3}/s (1,800 cu ft/s) (88 km (55 mi) from the mouth)

Basin features
- Progression: Ob→ Kara Sea

The Sob (Russian: Собь) is a river in Yamalo-Nenets Autonomous Okrug, Russia. The river is 185 kilometres (115 mi) long and has a catchment area of 5,890 square kilometres (2,270 sq mi).

The Sob flows across the Priuralsky and Shuryshkarsky districts. The Salekhard–Igarka Railway stretch of the Northern Railway runs along the valley of the Sob in the Polar Urals. Since it is of relatively easy access, the river has become a tourist attraction as a Class I to IV destination for rafting and kayaking.

== Course ==
The Sob is a left tributary of the Ob river. It has its sources in the eastern slopes of the southern sector of the Polar Urals. After leaving the mountainous area, the river flows roughly southeastwards and southwards among small lakes in a floodplain located at the northwestern end of the West Siberian Plain. Kharp town is located by its banks in its middle course. The area is marked by permafrost, being often swampy, and with patches of tundra and coniferous taiga. Finally the Sob meets the left bank of the Ob near Katravozh, about 322 km (200 mi) from its mouth.

=== Tributaries ===
The main tributaries of the Sob are the 55 km (34 mi) long Bolshaya Pai-Pudyna (Большая Пай-Пудына) and the 54 km (34 mi) long Khanmei (Ханмей) from the left, as well as the 54 km (34 mi) long Orekh-Yugan (Орех-Юган) and the 36 km (22 mi) long Yenga-Yu (Енга-Ю) from the right. The river is fed predominantly by snow and is frozen between October and June.

== Fauna ==
The main fish species in the river are muksun, peled, broad whitefish, nelma, and sturgeon.

== See also ==
- List of rivers of Russia
