= Ivan Panchenko =

Russian serial killer and rapist

- Born: Ivan Petrovich Panchenko; 27 January 1968 (age 58); Svetlograd, Stavropol Krai, RSFSR
- Other name: "The Svetlograd Maniac"
- Conviction: Murder
- Penalty: Life imprisonment

Details
- Victims: 5
- Span of crimes: 1998–2008
- Country: Russia
- State: Stavropol
- Date apprehended: 6 October 2008
- Imprisoned at: Polar Owl, Kharp, Yamalo-Nenets Autonomous Okrug

Ivan Petrovich Panchenko (Russian: Ива́н Петро́вич Па́нченко; born 27 January 1968), known as The Svetlograd Maniac (Russian: Светлоградский маньяк), is a Russian rapist and serial killer.

== Biography ==
Panchenko was born on 27 January 1968, in Svetlogorsk. In 1986, he was convicted for desertion from the military and theft. He was also twice convicted for the acquisition and possession of drugs, and for the murder of a colleague with whom he deserted. After the murder, Panchenko hid in a dugout in the forest.

After returning from the prison, Panchenko began his murder spree. On 30 September 1998, he shot his 18-year-old sister-in-law on the banks of the Kalaus River, then drowned the body. Four months later, he kidnapped his wife's 16-year-old younger sister, whom he held in the dugout for three years, repeatedly raping her before eventually killing her. Four months after that, he killed a 15-year-old friend of the second victim. However, Panchenko was soon detained and convicted for the murder of a colleague. He was released on parole in May 2007.

On 5 October 2008, Panchenko's son brought home two girls, 8 and 11 years old, whom Ivan lured into the dugout and locked in. He began to torture the younger girl, in the end eventually brutally beating her and burying her alive. He then planted a seedling at the burial site. During the day, he raped the 11-year-old girl, forcing her to wear a dog collar around her neck, but the police officers called by her parents managed to locate him with the help of a service dog. Panchenko was arrested on 6 October 2008.

Panchenko soon confessed to everything, including the murders from 10 years ago. During a search of his home, women's belongings were found which belonged to the victims. The forensic psychiatric examination recognized Panchenko as sane, and responsible for his actions. The investigation into the "Svetlograd Maniac" case was held in closed session and within the shortest time frame possible. On April 3, 2009, the Stavropol Regional Court sentenced Ivan Panchenko to life imprisonment and a fine of 800,000 rubles. The Supreme Court of Russia upheld the verdict without change. He is serving his sentence in the Polar Owl prison.

=== In the media ===
- In 2009, the documentary film "On the maniac's tracks" from the series "Honest Detective" was created.

== See also ==
- List of Russian serial killers
