= Alexander Elistratov =

Russian serial killer

- Born: Alexander Ivanovich Elistratov; 1954; Ulyanovsk, Ulyanovsk Oblast, Russian SFSR
- Died: 2011 (aged 56–57); Kharp, Yamalia, Russia
- Other names: "The Bloody Taxi Driver" "The Taxi Driver Serial Killer"
- Conviction: Murder x6
- Penalty: Life imprisonment

Details
- Victims: 6
- Span of crimes: 2005–2007
- Country: Russia
- State: Moscow
- Date apprehended: January 16, 2007
- Imprisoned at: Polar Owl

Alexander Ivanovich Elistratov (Russian: Александр Иванович Елистратов; 1954–2011), known as The Bloody Taxi Driver (Russian: Кровавый таксист), was a Russian robber and serial killer who killed six of his passengers in Moscow between 2005 and 2007, in addition to non-fatally robbing three others. He was convicted of the killings and sentenced to life imprisonment, which he was serving at the Polar Owl Colony.

== Early life ==
Elistratov was born in Ulyanovsk in 1954, but moved to the Kazakh SSR at an early age. In 1990, he returned to Russia, settling in Moscow's Federal Avenue with his wife, who gave birth to two sons. The couple later divorced, with the woman claiming that Alexander never paid for anything, but they still decided to live together as a family. Elistratov was described very positively by his acquaintances, especially by his blind neighbor Alesya, who claimed that he would drive her for free around the city and even buy her family salmon, despite being a man of modest means. Unbeknownst to them, Elistratov had four criminal convictions: two for illegal possession of weaponry, and one each for theft and robbery, but due to negligence of the authorities, he was presented as a first-time offender during his trials for the third and fourth convictions, for which he was given a 4-year suspended sentence in 2004.

== Crimes ==
That same year, Elistratov bought a rusty, old VAZ-2101, whose previous owner had recently died, signing it in the dead man's name. He presented himself as a private taxi driver, despite the fact that his passport, which was issued in the former Soviet Union and was now invalid since the country had dissolved, was never reported to the authorities, and he was allowed to continue his illegal practice undetected. One day, while browsing through the Cherkizovsky Market, he bought himself a homemade hunting rifle, which was modified to function like a sawn-off shotgun, stashing the weapon under the driver's seat. His modus operandi was to pick up potential victims in Moscow's Eastern and Northeastern Districts, always at night and near his home. As a rule of thumb, he would only attack victims who he thought had considerable riches, threatening to shoot them if they didn't give them up. If the victim resisted, he shot them with the sawn-off, dropping off the bodies on the side of the road and rummaging through their valuables, stealing only money and discarding the rest in garbage containers. He would use the stolen rubles to finance his family, saving up for a new car and apartment as well.

=== Chronology ===
- April 14, 2005: Elistratov picked up engineer Timofey Topolev-Soldunov on Zeleny Prospekt, with his destination being the Tverskaya Metro Station. He drove him to Zolotnoy Street, where he stopped the taxi and threatened him with the sawn-off shotgun. Topolev-Soldunov left behind 34,000 rubles and was frightened by the encounter, but was left unharmed, with his assailant quietly driving away.
- October 16, 2005: 54-year-old Armenian national Leyla Ismailovna Ioanesyan, the owner of a small café on Basmannaya, was hitchhiking to get home and was picked up by Elistratov. He stopped the car on the Okruzhny Passage and demanded Ioanesyan give up her valuables. When she refused, he shot her and dumped the body under a railway bridge along the Entuziastov Highway, where it would later be found by another taxi driver. Her bag contained 43,000 rubles, the café's weekly earnings, along with dirty cloths and towels, which were thrown out.
- March 6, 2006: he picked up hairdresser Lyudmila Blokhina near the Entuziastov Highway, driving her to Sokolina Gora, where he stopped the taxi and threatened her. The frightened Blokhina left behind all her belongings and jumped out of the vehicle. She later contacted the police, but mistakenly identified her attacker as a Caucasian. Elistratov's bounty from this incident was a measly 700 rubles.
- May 16, 2006: Elistratov picked up Armenian karate coach Artak Petrosyan on Spartakovskaya Street. When Artak resisted the mugging attempt, Alexander shot him in the stomach, tearing it apart. He then dumped the barely-alive Petrosyan near the All-Russian Exhibition Center in Prospekt Mira, driving away with the man's bag, which contained 1,000 rubles and some gym clothes. While Petrosyan managed to crawl to the nearby roadway to alert passers-by, who called an ambulance. The doctors couldn't save him, and he died from his injuries in the hospital. According to the people who found him, he kept repeating something about the rubles, and the Russian taxi driver who had shot him.
- August 9, 2006: he picked up saleswoman Anna Kuznetsova on Marshall Biryuzov Street, where he attempted to rob her. Kuznetsova actively resisted, causing Alexander to whip out his shotgun and shoot her. Despite her injuries, the woman continued to cling onto her bag, but was pushed out of the car and left to die. Miraculously, she was found by passers-by, who drove her to the hospital, where she managed to survive her near-fatal injuries. Elistratov's loot amounted to only 400 rubles.
- August 10, 2006: the following day, the body of a young woman, believed to be between 20 and 25 years of age and possibly Armenian, was found on Novolesnaya Street. Despite the authorities' efforts, they couldn't establish her identity, and the victim remains unidentified.
- October 17, 2006: Elistratov picked up 32-year-old Marina Tretyakova, from Kabardino-Balkaria, on Vlamirskaya Street, with her destination being Skhodnenskaya Metro Station, where her brother was waiting for her. Originally, a friend of hers had offered to call for a taxi, but Marina had decided to save some money by boarding the cheaper private ones. Along the way, she was shot, killed, and robbed, with Elistratov dumping her body in a ditch near the Putilkovskoe Highway.
- October 29, 2006: while driving around the Semyonovskaya Metro Station, Elistratov picked up 19-year-old Olga "Olya" Baydakova, a Muscovite of Greek descent who was a student at the Institute of Physical Education. An actress and fashion show participant, she was returning home after being appointed a toastmaster at a wedding. When the taxi reached the Entuziastov Highway, Elistratov shot and killed her, robbing her of her rubles and removing the body from the car, before calmly driving away.
- January 16, 2007: on that night, Elistratov picked up his final victim on Chermyanskaya Street: he was Andrey Zhukov, the general director of a local publishing house. While on the way, Alexander demanded that he hand over his cash, and when Zhukov resisted, he was shot in the stomach. Noticing that a police patrol car was just across the road, he jumped out of the taxi and began waving his arms at the officers, shouting that the driver had hit him with a stun gun. Realising that he had been seen, Elistratov drove away in an attempt to escape, but was pursued by the officers. He accidentally found himself in a dead end, leaping out of the car and climbing over a fence with barbed wire. However, he got caught up in the wire, and the policemen arrested him on the spot. Meanwhile, Zhukov, who was left behind to wait for an ambulance, had already died as a result of his injuries.

== Trial and imprisonment ==
The hunt for the so-called "Bloody Taxi Driver" stirred great controversy in the city, since, as it would later turn out, the agencies could've captured the criminal much earlier and prevented any further bloodshed. On the body of one victim, a bloody newspaper was found which detailed the then-recent arrest of Alexander Pichushkin. In it, investigators noticed that an apartment number, 39, was stamped by a postman, and they subsequently checked every single apartment in the city which had that number. Astonishingly, they also visited the Elistratov family's home, but since Alexander wasn't officially registered as a citizen living in Moscow, but instead as still living in his hometown of Ulyanovsk, he managed to avoid arrest.

During the subsequent investigations, Elistratov partially admitted guilt, claiming that he had killed the last victim, Zhukov, by negligence: according to him, Andrey started arguing with him, and had attempted to pull his sawn-off away from him when the weapon accidentally discharged. However, his claims were disregarded, and not long after, several blood samples which were found on his car were connected to the various murder victims. Elistratov was ordered an examination at the Serbsky Center, where he was found to be sane and completely aware of his actions, but was determined to have an aggressive personality. During his trial, he kicked a Kommersant journalist who was filming him. His refusal to divulge his motive for the murders led the Russian media to peddle various theories, varying from ethnic hatred (as the majority of his victims were foreigners or looked like ones) to envy against the working class, with some claiming that he prayed for his victims' soul in front of the icons in his home, and even that he had seen some of his future victims in his dreams, appearing before him in the forms of pigeons and doves. However, none of these were confirmed.

On March 26, 2008, the Moscow City Court sentenced Alexander Elistratov to life imprisonment, with the verdict upheld by the Supreme Court of Russia. He was imprisoned at the Polar Owl Colony, from where he tried unsuccessfully to escape and died as a result of his injuries after being attacked by guard dogs at Polar Owl Colony, on June 3, 2011.

== See also ==
- List of Russian serial killers
