= Alexander Lokhtachyov and Pavel Safonov =

Russian serial killers

Alexander Lokhtachyov
- Born: Alexander Sergeyevich Lokhtachyov; 1981 (age 44–45); Magnitogorsk, Chelyabinsk Oblast, RSFSR
- Convictions: Murder x10 Rape
- Penalty: Life imprisonment x2

Details
- Victims: 10
- Span of crimes: 2003–2004
- Country: Russia
- State: Chelyabinsk
- Date apprehended: February 2004
- Imprisoned at: Polar Owl, Kharp, Yamalo-Nenets Autonomous Okrug

Pavel Safonov
- Born: Pavel Yuryevich Safonov; 1982 (age 43–44); Magnitogorsk, Chelyabinsk Oblast, RSFSR
- Convictions: Murder x8 Rape
- Penalty: Life imprisonment

Details
- Victims: 8
- Span of crimes: 2003–2004
- Country: Russia
- State: Chelyabinsk
- Date apprehended: February 2004
- Imprisoned at: White Swan, Solikamsk, Perm Krai

Alexander Sergeyevich Lokhtachyov (Russian: Александр Сергеевич Лохтачёв; born 1981, Magnitogorsk, Chelyabinsk Oblast, RSFSR) and Pavel Yuryevich Safonov (Russian: Павел Юрьевич Сафонов; born 1982, Magnitogorsk, Chelyabinsk Oblast, RSFSR) are a pair of Russian serial killers who raped and murdered eight women and girls around Magnitogorsk and its environs from 2003 and 2004, with Lokhtachyov murdering two others by himself. Both were found guilty on all counts to their respective crimes and have received life sentences.

== Murders ==
=== First murder ===
The pair's first recorded murder dates back to one night in July 2003, when Lokhtachyov and Safonov were out drinking and searching for the company of a woman around Magnitogorsk. They finally came across a young woman at the intersection of Karl Marx Avenue and Leningradskaya Street and convinced her to join them - they then drove to a field near the village of Verkhnezikilsky, where both took turns raping her.

After they were finished, the victim threatened that she would report them to the police. Lokhtachyov and Safonov then grabbed a lace from a tracksuit and choked her to death. When she stopped breathing, they poured gasoline over the corpse and burned it, whereupon they got into Lokhtachyov's car and went back to Magnitogorsk.

=== Killing spree ===
Lokhtachyov and Safonov did not meet up for approximately two months after the first murder, mostly due to work and personal reasons. When they met again, they planned to abduct another victim from Karl Marx Avenue. After selecting another young woman and offering her free alcohol, they drove to the outskirts of Magnitogorsk, next to the cement plant. After taking turns raping her, Lokhtachyov and Safonov then choked her to death and burned the body just like the first victim.

In October, the pair got a new Volkswagen and sought out a new victim at Karl Marx Avenue. They took in two friends, but took one of them home at her request, while the other decided to go with them. She was then brought to a beach, where Lokhtachyov and Safonov proceeded to sexually assault her. Pretending that they would drive her back, Lokhtachyov drove until they reached an embankment of the Ural River - he then stopped the car, pretending to have engine trouble. Safonov and the victim then got out, ostensibly to help push it, but she was then hit on the head and strangled with a shoestring. Her body was then thrown into the Ural, and the two killers left.

The pair repeated their usual routine with another young woman in November, but this with more violent methods - both used a noose to strangle her and then hit her on the head with a meat cleaver. While the pair were burning the body, they noticed that an elderly man had seen them do it, but quickly sped away in his KAMAZ truck.

=== Kosterkin murders ===
Unwilling to leave any witnesses behind, Lokhtachyov and Safonov scrambled to find any information on the truck driver. They eventually learned that the man was a 73-year-old pensioner by the name of Kosterkin, who lived in the nearby village of Novosavinka. After some consideration, Lokhtachyov got drunk, stole his grandfather's sawed-off shotgun and went to Novosavinka by himself in the middle of the night. After burgling into Kosterkin's house and locating him, he shot the pensioner twice in the chest, before going into an adjacent room and shooting dead the man's 43-year-old son, who was still sleeping.

Lokhtachyov then returned to Magnitogorsk and told Safonov what had happened. Due to a lack of evidence and suspects, the double murder quickly became a cold case.

=== Final victims ===
Lokhtachyov and Safonov soon resumed committing crimes together, killing three additional victims in December alone. The first of these victims was killed sometime early into the month in a manner similar to the previous ones, while the latter two were killed within a week of each other near the end of the month.

The sixth victim was picked up from Karl Marx Avenue on Christmas and driven to the cement plant, where the two men raped and strangled her before throwing the body into a nearby pit and setting it ablaze. Safonov even took her sheepskin coat with him, possibly as a trophy. The seventh victim was picked up a week later, but the car stalled on the way to the cement plant near Tsementsik, leading Lokhtachyov and Safonov to rape and kill on the roadside and then drag the body to the pit. They lit the body on fire again and left, but this victim's body was not as badly affected as the others'.

The final victim was killed sometime in early February 2004. After being confronted by the two at the local cinema, she was driven to the outskirts of the village of Kirsa, where she was raped and strangled. Lokhtachyov and Safonov then took the body to a nearby forest reserve, where they doused the body with gasoline and set it on fire.

== Arrest, trial and imprisonment ==
On January 24, 2004, the police found the charred body of the seventh victim, but were unable to establish her identity until a week and a half later. After this, they started a thorough investigation, resulting in similarly burned corpses of women being located around Magnitogorsk.

A break in the case came when the girlfriend of one of the killers contacted the police, claiming that he had confessed to her what he had done. Shortly afterwards, both Lokhtachyov and Safonov were arrested and charged with the murders of the eight women. In November of that year, they were found guilty on all counts, and each was given a life term.

=== Confessions ===
In June 2021, while serving his life term at the Polar Owl colony, Lokhtachyov suddenly contacted investigators, claiming that he wanted to confess to the Kosterkin murders. He readily confessed to being the killer, but claimed he had been hired to do it by a corrupt prosecutor and policeman who had previous issues with Kosterkin.

His version of events was not accepted, and Lokhtachyov was soon charged with the double murder. He was found guilty three months later, and was given another life term to be served consecutively with his previous one.

== See also ==
- List of Russian serial killers
