= Mount Payer =

Mountain in Yamalo-Nenets Autonomous Okrug, Russia

- Пайер
- Location within Yamalo-Nenets Autonomous Okrug Location within Russia

Highest point
- Elevation: 1,472 m (4,829 ft)
- Prominence: 1,153 m (3,783 ft)
- Isolation: 213.9 km (132.9 mi)
- Listing: Ribu
- Coordinates: 66°43′15″N 64°23′30″E

Geography
- Location: Yamalo-Nenets Autonomous Okrug, Russia
- Parent range: Polar Urals

Climbing
- Easiest route: From Yeletsky, Kharp or Labytnangi

Mount Payer (Russian: Пайер) is a peak in the Yamalo-Nenets Autonomous Okrug, Russia. It is the highest point of the okrug and of the Polar Urals, as well as one of the highest of the wider Ural mountain system.

The name of the mountain originated in the Nenets language "pai/er" (пай/ер), meaning "rock/master".

== Description ==
Mount Payer is a 1,472 metres (4,829 ft) high mountain located near the Arctic Circle in the Polar Urals, a subrange of the Urals. It rises in the middle part of the range, in Shuryshkarsky District, near the border of the Komi Republic. The mountain has three peaks, the highest of which is a 1,472 metres (4,829 ft) high flat-topped rocky summit. The western peak is 1,330 metres (4,360 ft) high, and the eastern 1,217 metres (3,993 ft).

== See also ==
- List of highest points of Russian federal subjects
- List of mountains and hills of Russia
