= Oleg Ten =

Russian serial killer (born 1975)

- Born: Oleg Ilarionovich Ten; 1 March 1975 (age 51); Tashkent, Uzbek SSR
- Other names: "The Policeman Maniac" "The Wolf in Sheep's Clothing"
- Conviction: Murder ×3
- Penalty: Life imprisonment (2007); 12.5 years imprisonment (2022)

Details
- Victims: 3+
- Span of crimes: 2004–2005
- Country: Russia
- State: Saint Petersburg
- Date apprehended: 16 January 2006
- Imprisoned at: Polar Owl, Kharp, Yamalo-Nenets Autonomous Okrug

Oleg Ilarionovich Ten (Russian: Олег Илларионович Тен; born 1 March 1975), known as The Policeman Maniac (Russian: Маньяк-милиционер), is an Uzbekistani-born Russian serial killer and former policeman who abducted, killed and dismembered at least three women in Saint Petersburg from 2004 to 2005. Initially convicted for two murders and sentenced to life imprisonment, he confessed to a third murder in 2019, and since then authorities have been investigating possible links to other unsolved murders.

== Early life ==
Oleg Ilarionovich Ten was born in Tashkent, Uzbek SSR in 1975. At some point during his life, he moved to Saint Petersburg, Russia, where he would reside until his arrest. He went to a police academy and after successfully graduating, he found work in the private security sector for the Ministry of Internal Affairs. Ten was also married, raised three children and considered highly-intelligent due to his education.

Unbeknownst to most, however, Ten also developed a gambling addiction and frequently visited local casinos. As he often lost the majority of his monthly salary to this, he resorted to working as a private taxi driver as a secondary job. He eventually decided to start stealing from potential customers, and would resort to killing them if necessary.

== Murders ==
Ten's first confirmed murder occurred on the night of 5 to 6 August 2004. On that day, he was driving around in his red GAZ-3110 when he spotted an 18-year-old university student hitching for a ride from the Pionerskaya Metro Station. He decided to pick her up, but for an unclear reason, the pair had an argument along the way. Upon reaching an isolated area of Sofia Kovalevskaya Street, Ten stopped the car and attacked the victim, eventually managing to pull her out of the car. After doing so, he pushed her to the ground, pulled out a knife and stabbed her 13 times in the head, chest and neck. Following the murder, Ten proceeded to mutilate her body and sever her left breast before leaving the body in a nearby yard.

His next known attack occurred on 21 July 2005. While driving around town after suffering another loss at a casino, he spotted 24-year-old accountant Natalya Kosenkova walking down the street. He noticed that she wore gold jewellery and, thinking he could sell it for money, decided to follow her to her apartment on Danube Avenue. After following the woman to the elevator, he threatened her with a knife and told her to go to the apartment and hand over her valuables. A struggle ensued, during which Kosenkova attempted to fight back by hitting her assailant on the head with a bottle. This only enraged Ten, who got his knife out and swiftly cut her throat. Upon collecting all her jewellery, money and mobile phone, he proceeded to sever her breasts and gouge her eyes out, before eventually leaving the premises. A neighbour later saw him leaving the premises, but after being questioned by police, they could only provide a vague description of the offender, describing him as an unfamiliar man of Asian origin. Ten would later be stopped and questioned by a police patrol, since he matched the facial composite of the suspect, but would be let go due to lack of evidence. Despite this, his details were entered into the criminal database just in case.

On 11 December 2005, Ten picked up 21-year-old student Tatyana Biktuganova from Pionerskaya Metro Station, with the instructions that he drive her to Finland Station, where some friends were waiting for her. A few minutes into the trip, however, he changed directions and drove to an isolated location, where he proceeded to attack his passenger. Using his knife, he stabbed her multiple times before ultimately slashing her throat and killing her. Afterwards, he stole whatever money she had on her as well as her mobile phone, which he decided to use for himself. Ten would later be detained and questioned by colleagues yet again but was released after he showed his police badge and ID.

== Arrest, trial and imprisonment ==
About a month after Biktuganova's murder, another taxi driver spotted what seemed to be bloodstains on the back of Ten's car, which he immediately reported to police. He was soon arrested, and after checking his belongings, authorities found the student's mobile phone on him. When queried as to why it was in his possession, Ten claimed that he had picked up two young women not too long ago, one of whom forgot her phone on the back seat—as he did not know either of them, he decided that he would just sell at the market instead.

While his explanation was not convincing, investigators decided not to press charges and instead asked him about Kosenkova's killing. To their surprise, Ten immediately confessed to her murder and explained in detail how he had done it. Due to this, he was initially charged solely with her killing, but when Biktuganova's remains were found in April 2006, a DNA link was established between him and biological evidence left behind by the killer. As a result, Ten was tried and found guilty in jury trial, with a 10–2 decision stating that he did not deserve any leniency. He was thereafter convicted on all counts and sentenced to life imprisonment, which he was to serve at the remote Polar Owl colony.

Even before his first trial, there were suspicions that Ten could have been involved in further murders, but with a lack of concrete evidence, he was not charged with any. In 2019, investigators from Saint Petersburg were reviewing old cold cases when they came across the unnamed student murder, noting that it shared similarities with how Biktuganova had been killed and both were last seen at Pionerskaya Metro Station. Several operatives were then dispatched to Polar Owl to question Ten about the case, and after some time, he eventually admitted responsibility for the crime. Soon afterwards, he was charged with the killing and extradited to stand trial in Saint Petersburg. In February 2022, he was convicted and sentenced to an additional 12.5 years of imprisonment to be served concurrently with his previously imposed life sentence.

Authorities have since started reinvestigating other cold cases in Saint Petersburg and the surrounding area, as they believe that Ten has likely killed or maimed others. He is currently being investigated for a series of murders committed in Pushkin during the early 2000s when several young women were killed near the Alexandrovskaya Metro Station—at the time, Ten was still at the police academy and constantly travelled home through this exact station.

== See also ==
- List of Russian serial killers
