= Yevgeny Kolesnikov =

Russian serial killer

- Born: Yevgeny Anatolyevich Kolesnikov; 20 October 1984; Solikamsk, Perm Krai, RSFSR
- Died: 2016 (aged 31–32); Polar Owl Colony, Kharp, Yamalo-Nenets Autonomous Okrug, Russia
- Cause of death: Suicide
- Other name: "The Orphan of Solikamsk"
- Conviction: Murder x6
- Penalty: Life imprisonment

Details
- Victims: 6
- Span of crimes: 2006–2007
- Country: Russia
- State: Perm
- Date apprehended: 30 January 2007

Yevgeny Anatolyevich Kolesnikov (en Ukrainian: Евге́ний Анато́льевич Коле́сников; 20 October 1984 – 2016), known as The Orphan of Solikamsk (Russian: Сирота Соликамская), was a Russian serial killer and robber who, together with his girlfriend Olga Chekotina, robbed and killed six elderly people in Solikamsk from December 2006 to January 2007. For these crimes, he was convicted and sentenced to life imprisonment, committing suicide in prison in 2016.

== Biography ==
Yevgeny Kolesnikov was born on 20 October 1984 in Solikamsk. At the time of his birth, his father was in prison and his mother was an alcoholic, and as there was nobody reliable to take care of him, he was sent to an orphanage. While living there, tutors described him as a calm, but very easily influenced and meek boy who was frequently bullied by other children. Despite this, he often attempted to provide cover for others who had committed some misdeed, apparently convinced that he was alone and had to do everything by himself.

In 1988, Kolesnikov was adopted by the Surikov family, who subsequently changed his patronymic and surname. From the very first days in their care, he showed signs of kleptomania, for which he was sent to numerous psychiatrists for treatment, but without any results. This only worsened when Kolesnikov started hanging out with questionable crowds, using drugs and being outside the house for prolonged periods of time. After nine years, the Surikovs decided to return him to the orphanage.

Shortly after becoming an adult and being released from the orphanage, Kolesnikov was arrested for theft and sent to prison. He was released in 2006 and settled in Solikamsk, accompanied by 25-year-old Olga Chekotina, his girlfriend whom he had met at the orphanage and who had served time for causing grievous bodily harm. Primarily influenced by Chekotina, the two decided to earn money by stealing and robbing elderly residents.

== Murders ==
The pair committed their first theft on the night of 12 to 13 December 2006, followed by several others in quick succession, mostly finding food, household appliances and money. On 27 December, Kolesnikov and Chekotina entered an apartment with the intent to rob it, but accidentally came across the 90-year-old homeowner in the hallway. Unwilling to leave a witness to their crimes, Kolesnikov took a screwdriver and stabbed her, while Chekotina grabbed a rag, threw it on the woman's face and set it on fire. They then stole 1,000 rubles and set the apartment on fire to cover up their tracks. While the victim was found still alive and taken to the hospital, she subsequently succumbed to her injuries.

The second murder occurred on 2 January 2007, with the victim being a veteran of the Great Patriotic War whom Kolesnikov stabbed to death with a knife. After killing the man, the duo stole his pension, amounting to 25,000 rubles, before they got into a taxi and left the area.

On 8 January, Kolesnikov and Chekotina broke into another apartment, with the former stabbing to death the elderly woman living there with a knife. They then robbed the premises and set the apartment on fire. On 13 January, Kolesnikov helped an elderly woman to transfer money to her mobile operator and was invited over to her house for some soup and tea, but was later caught attempting to steal 150 rubles from the pocket of her raincoat. Realizing that he was a thief, the woman began to scream, causing him to punch her repeatedly until she fell down and allowed him to escape. The victim was dead days later, with the autopsy confirming that she had died of a heart attack brought on by the assault.

On 25 January, he entered another apartment by himself and killed the woman with an axe, before stealing 200 rubles and an electric kettle.

The final killings occurred on 27 January, when Kolesnikov and Chekotina broke into an apartment occupied by a disabled elderly couple (81-year-old wife and 82-year-old husband, respectively), which Kolesnikov stabbed to death with a knife. After killing them, the pair stole a single hair clipper before fleeing.

=== Arrest, trial and suicide ===
Only three days after the double murders, both Kolesnikov and Chekotina were arrested in the latter's apartment. The subsequent investigation into their crimes lasted more than six months, ending with Kolesnikov's confession of committing six murders in total, in five of which he was aided by his girlfriend. While he was acknowledged as the main perpetrator, investigators concluded that if he had not been instigated by Chekotina to start killing, he likely would have remained a simple thief.

Eventually, both defendants were tried and found guilty of their respective charges before the Perm Regional Court, which sentenced Kolesnikov to life imprisonment and Chekotina to 18 years imprisonment. The verdicts were appealed to the Supreme Court, which subsequently upheld them.

After his conviction, Kolesnikov was sent to serve his sentence at the Polar Owl Colony in the village of Kharp, in the Yamalo-Nenets Autonomous Okrug. He remained there until sometime in 2016 when an article about the conditions of the colony and featuring interviews with prisoners living there revealed that Kolesnikov had been the latest inmate to commit suicide and had been buried in the graveyard.

== In the media and culture ==
Kolesnikov's case was covered in an episode of Above the Law (Russian: Вне закона), titled "The Orphan of Solikamsk" (Russian: Сирота Соликамская).

== See also ==
- List of Russian serial killers
