= IK-3 =

IK-3 can mean:

- Rogožarski IK-3, a 1930s Yugoslav monoplane single-seat fighter
- FKU IK-3, Kharp, a penal colony in the Yamalo-Nenets Autonomous Okrug of Russia
