= Mikhail Yudin (serial killer) =

Russian serial killer (born 1975)

- Михаи́л Ю́дин
- Born: Mikhail Alexandrovich Yudin; 16 November 1975 (age 50); Nagorny, Altai Krai, RSFSR
- Other name: "The Berdsk Maniac"
- Conviction: Murder
- Penalty: Life imprisonment

Details
- Victims: 5
- Span of crimes: 1999–2002
- Country: Russia
- State: Novosibirsk
- Date apprehended: September 2003
- Imprisoned at: Polar Owl, Kharp, Yamalo-Nenets Autonomous Okrug

Mikhail Alexandrovich Yudin (Russian: Михаи́л Алекса́ндрович Ю́дин; born 16 November 1975), known as The Berdsk Maniac (Russian: Бердский маньяк), is a Russian serial killer who operated in and around the town of Berdsk between 1999 and 2002.

== Early life ==
A native from the village of Nagorny in Altai Krai, Yudin lived with his mother and brother. After the end of 8th grade of secondary school, he served in the army, and following his discharge, he left for the Novosibirsk Oblast, to the city of Iskitim, where he worked at a construction site. From an early age, acquaintances noted Yudin's sullenness and his stiffness in communicating with people. According to them, his character changed only when in a state of intoxication. In the summer of 1998, Yudin moved to the city of Berdsk, where he met a woman and began living with her, also starting work as a constructor.

== Crimes ==
On 12 August 1998, Yudin met a lone woman near the Berdsk plant "Giant", offering to take her home. Then, when they arrived at a deserted location, he attacked, raped and tried to strangle her. However, the victim survived, as the attacker was scared off by plant workers who were on a morning shift. The woman appealed to the police, but Yudin was not caught.

A year later, in the summer of 1999, Yudin committed his first murder. He dragged a 16-year-old girl into the bushes next to a bus stop, and raped her for about an hour. This time, despite hearing the footsteps of random passers-by, he did not run away. The victim tried to attract attention, but did not succeed. Yudin strangled her, took her watch and earrings and then left. Hours later, he gave the watch to his wife, and the earrings to his mother. In the autumn of 1999, the construction team in which Yudin worked was sent to Novosibirsk. On 23 November, while intoxicated, Yudin raped and killed a girl in her own apartment. He then took the victim's fur coat and gave it to his wife.

A month later, Yudin was detained for attempted robbery. Six months after that, he was amnestied in connection with the celebration of the 55th anniversary of victory in the Great Patriotic War, and on 14 July 2000, Yudin went free.

In August–September 2000, Yudin committed two more murders. He lured his victims to deserted places, in the plantations of Berdsk in particular. From one of his victims, a student of the Novosibirsk Conservatory returning from a musical concert rehearsal, he took a flute. Yudin often sat for a long time in his barn, where he admired his trophies. On 18 October, he tried to rape a female acquaintance in her own apartment, but she, having fiercely resisted, kicked him out. He then paid a bribe to his unfortunate victim so that she would not report him to the police.

Meanwhile, panic broke out in the city. Since Yudin preferred petite brunettes dressed in form-fitting pants, almost every fifth resident of Berdsk could be a possible suspect. Girls tried to return home before dark, and schoolgirls were met by parents after lessons, with many women changing their clothing and changing their hair color. The next murder Yudin committed occurred two years later, in December 2002. The victim was a girl whom he killed in her apartment. In this case, a man named Alexei Gaskov, who had been contained several times in a drunk tank, confessed to the murder, but it was later revealed that it was a false confession.

== Arrest, trial and imprisonment ==
In September 2003, Yudin was arrested, but was soon released under the condition of not leaving city borders. In the meantime, a genetic examination was conducted, which confirmed that all of the murders were committed by him. He was taken back into custody and soon confessed to committing five murders and 23 cases of brigandage, robberies and rapes. The forensic psychiatric examination recognized Mikhail Yudin as fully sane and responsible for his actions. On 7 June 2004, the case was referred to the court, which on 2 December, Yudin was sentenced to life imprisonment. The Supreme Court of Russia upheld the verdict without changing it, and Yudin is currently serving his sentence at the Polar Owl prison.

== Exposure of Gaskov and new allegations ==
Following his elimination as a suspect in the Berdsk Maniac crimes, Alexei Gaskov was arrested for another violent crime - the rape of an 11-year-old girl. It was revealed that sometime during the summer of 2006, a female friend of his wife went to their apartment for a sleepover, accompanied by her daughter. At some point during the night, an intoxicated Gaskov got the girl drunk before proceeding to rape her, infecting her with a venereal disease in the process. He was convicted of this crime and an earlier robbery, receiving a sentence of 10.5 years imprisonment. After serving out his sentence in full, he was released and moved to Novosibirsk.

On 15 January 2025, Gaskov was arrested after DNA linked him to at least four murders committed in the Moscow Oblast from 2000 to 2002. It was revealed that he had admitted to these crimes after his arrest for rape in 2007, but prosecutors could not charge him due to a lack of evidence to secure a conviction. Currently, investigations are ongoing to determine if he is responsible for any other cold cases in Moscow or Novosibirsk. Since these revelations, it has been suggested by several news articles that he might have committed crimes with the help of Yudin, with whom he has been friends since 1998.

== In the media ==
- Documentary film from the series "Criminal Russia" - "The Gene of the Murderer" (2006)

== See also ==
- List of Russian serial killers
