= Polar Owl =

Federal prison in Russia

- Interactive map of Polar Owl
- Location: Kharp, Yamalo-Nenets Autonomous Okrug, Russia; 66.805°N 65.79°E
- Status: Operational
- Capacity: 1014
- Population: 450
- Opened: 1961
- Managed by: Federal Penitentiary Service
- Governor: Lieutenant Colonel Aleksandr Tsybulsky

The Federal Governmental Institution — penal colony No. 18 of the Federal Penitentiary Service of Russia in Yamalo-Nenets Autonomous Okrug, (Note: Russian: ОГ 98/18 или Федеральное казённое учреждение «Исправительная колония № 18 Управления Федеральной службы исполнения наказаний по Ямало-Ненецкому автономному округу».) commonly known as the Polar Owl (Russian: Полярная сова, romanized: Polyarnaya sova), is a Russian prison located on the bank of the Sob River near the Polar Urals in the urban-type settlement of Kharp. It is one of the seven supermax ("special regimen", in Russian terminology) corrective labor colonies operated by the Federal Penitentiary Service for convicts sentenced to life imprisonment in Russia. In addition to special regimen it has sections with common and strict regimens.

== History ==
Kharp was founded in 1961 during the construction of the Salekhard–Igarka Railway. The core of the new settlement was a camp for prisoners who worked on laying the railway. Subsequently, the camp was transformed into a prison for particularly dangerous recidivists. The prison received the status of a colony for life convicts in 2005.

In 2010–2012, there were reports in the media that some employees of the colony were involved in a scandal with the falsification of confession. Some guards were suspected of beating testimonies from prisoners with the use of physical and psychological violence. Novaya Gazeta reported 190 false confessions, while Izvestia reported 32. According to Novaya Gazeta, the Federal Penitentiary Service for the Yamalo-Nenets Autonomous Okrug tried to hush up the case, since high-ranking officials could be involved in it.

== Notable inmates ==
Name	Born	Notes
Nikolai Ageyev	1974	Russian serial killer who killed his cellmate at Polar Owl
Firuz Aituganov	1990	Tajikistani serial killer and rapist
Alexander Elistratov	1954–2011	Made an unsuccessful escape attempt in 2011 Russian robber and serial killer
Alexander Greba	1980	Russian serial killer
Yevgeny Kolesnikov	1984–2016	Killed himself at the colony, Russian serial killer
Nikolay Korolyov	1981	Leader of the neo-Nazi terrorist group Spas
Nur-Pashi Kulayev	1980	Sole survivor of the 32 hostage-takers in the 2004 Beslan school hostage crisis
Alexander Lokhtachyov	1981	1/2 pair of Russian serial killers who raped and murdered eight women and girls around Magnitogorsk
Sergey Osipenko	1970	Kazakhstani-Russian serial killer and rapist
Ivan Panchenko	1968	Russian rapist and serial killer.
Alexander Pichushkin	1974	Serial killer
Sergey Pomazun	1981	Mass shooter
Oleg Ten	1975	Uzbekistani-born Russian serial killer and former policeman
Dmitry Voronenko	1971	Kyrgyzstani-Ukrainian serial killer
Mikhail Yudin	1975	Russian serial killer
Abdufatto Zamanov	1973	Tajik-born Russian serial killer
Sergey Zastynchanu	1979	Moldovan serial killer
Alexander Zhizhich	1979	One half of a killing team with his brother
Timur Bekmansurov	2003	Mass shooter

== See also ==
- IK-3 "Polar Wolf", another prison in Kharp
