= Sergey Osipenko =

Kazakhstani-Russian serial killer and rapist (born 1970)

- Born: Sergey Alekseevich Osipenko; 6 March 1970 (age 56); Balkhash, Kazakh SSR
- Other names: "The Rossoshansky Maniac" "The Short Maniac"
- Conviction: Murder
- Penalty: Life imprisonment

Details
- Victims: 4
- Span of crimes: 2005–2006
- Country: Russia
- State: Voronezh
- Date apprehended: 6 April 2006
- Imprisoned at: Polar Owl, Kharp, Yamalo-Nenets Autonomous Okrug

Sergey Alekseevich Osipenko (Russian: Серге́й Алексе́евич Осипе́нко; born 6 March 1970), known as The Rossoshansky Maniac (Russian: Россошанский маньяк), is a Kazakhstani-Russian serial killer and rapist. From 2005 to 2006, he murdered 4 girls and women in the Voronezh Oblast.

== Biography ==
In the 1990s, he worked in the Ministry of Internal Affairs of Kazakhstan. In 1999, Osipenko moved from his native Kazakhstan to the city of Rossosh, settling on the market to sell products to other vendors. He was fond of psychology and criminology, was married, and had a daughter.

Osipenko committed the murders in a pattern: he would follow his victim, who lived in five-storey houses on the upper floors, go into the apartment with them, then rape and kill the owner, before plundering the place.

On 24 January 2005, in Rossosh, Osipenko killed his first victim, 17-year-old Anna Berezhnaya. The killer attacked her as soon as she entered her apartment, beating the girl and threatening her with a knife. He then forced her to go to the bedroom, cut off her clothes, taped her mouth with a plaster, raped and finally killed her with a piece of metal pipe.

On 17 August 2005, in Voronezh, he raped and killed 38-year-old Elena Meleshko.

On 25 January 2006, in Voronezh, Osipenko attacked 15-year-old Anna Pobedinskaya, who was returning from school, raping and then killing her.

On 6 March 2006, in Rossosh, he raped and killed 13-year-old Yulia Yatskaya, who lived in the same neighbourhood as Berezhnaya.

There was a witness who saw Osipenko on the day of Yatskaya's murder, drawing attention to his short height of 167 cm.

The killer planned to leave for Kazakhstan, but on 6 April 2006, he was detained at a railway station in the Kurgan Oblast. He did not resist arrest and spoke freely of his crimes.

In late September 2006, the Voronezh Regional Prosecutor's Office forwarded the Osipenko case, consisting of 16 volumes, to the court. He requested that his case be tried by jury, in the hope of gaining leniency and avoiding life imprisonment. But on 7 December, the Voronezh Regional Court delivered a verdict, according to which Osipenko was found guilty and did not deserve leniency. On 14 December, he was sentenced to life imprisonment. The Supreme Court of Russia upheld the sentence.

He is serving his sentence in the "Polar Owl" colony.

== In the media ==
- Documentary film "Who will stop a maniac?" from the series by Vakhtang Mikeladze "Sentenced for life"

== See also ==
- List of Russian serial killers
