= Alexander Greba =

Russian serial killer

- Born: Alexander Ivanovich Greba; 23 September 1980 (age 46); Moshchenoe, Belgorod Oblast, RSFSR
- Other names: "The Goblin" "The Belgorod Maniac" "Belgorod Mowgli"
- Conviction: Murder
- Penalty: Life imprisonment

Details
- Victims: 5
- Span of crimes: 1996–2004
- Country: Russia
- State: Belgorod
- Date apprehended: 6 July 2004
- Imprisoned at: Polar Owl, Kharp, Yamalo-Nenets Autonomous Okrug

Alexander Ivanovich Greba (Russian: Алекса́ндр Ива́нович Гре́ба; born 23 September 1980), known as The Goblin (Russian: Леший), is a Russian serial killer. In March 2005, he was sentenced to life imprisonment for several murders.

== Background ==
Greba was born on 23 September 1980, in Moshchenoye, Yakovlevsky District. His parents divorced when he was two years old. His father left due to being unable to tolerate his wife. Greba's mother drank heavily and often stole from the household. After her second marriage also ended, she vented her frustrations on her children, particularly Alexander. The family faced financial difficulties, and by the age of 10, Greba began stealing. As he grew older, he fled to the forest, where he lived for some time.

At the age of 16, Greba was convicted of murder. On a cold day, he left the forest and broke into a coop. When the landlady entered, he killed her because she reminded him of his mother. He was caught at the scene and sentenced to 8 years and 10 months in prison. He was released on parole in April 2004.

After his release, Greba lived with his aunt. Two months later, he committed another murder, killing an elderly man he encountered in a barn before fleeing into the forest. Less than a week later, he killed an elderly woman, ate food from her house, took some valuables, and returned to the forest. Authorities launched a search, eventually discovering his hut, though Greba watched them from nearby.

The precinct officer who had investigated the first murder identified Greba by chance. Following this, Greba committed a double murder, killing two elderly women whom he had asked for shelter. Prior to this, he had sought work from a local Orthodox church but was refused. The daughter of one of the victims called the police, leading to his arrest. Greba was sentenced to life imprisonment and attempted to appeal the verdict. After his appeal failed, he became religious in prison. He is currently serving his sentence at the Polar Owl prison.

== See also ==
- List of Russian serial killers
