= Abdufatto Zamanov =

Convicted Tajikistani-Russian serial killer

- Born: Abdufatto Tashpulatovich Zamanov; 7 April 1973 (age 53); Somoniyon, Central District, Tajik SSR
- Other name: "The Krasnoyarsk Chikatilo"
- Conviction: Murder
- Penalty: Life imprisonment

Details
- Victims: 14
- Span of crimes: 2002–2004
- Country: Russia
- State: Krasnoyarsk
- Date apprehended: 9 December 2004

Abdufatto Tashpulatovich Zamanov (Russian: Абдуфатто́ Ташпула́тович Зама́нов; born 7 April 1973), known as The Krasnoyarsk Chikatilo (Russian: Красноярский Чикатило), is a Tajik-born Russian serial killer. Between June 2002 and November 2004, he killed nine men and five women in Krasnoyarsk and its suburbs on the basis of personal hostility, also raped two girls aged between 12 and 16.

== Biography ==
Zamanov was born in the Tajik SSR, but moved to Krasnoyarsk in 1993. He killed his victims in suburban areas, in public gardens, near cafes and roads, with the first murder committed at a cemetery. "At the same time he used knives and household items", the press release said. The bloodiest of the attacks occurred in November 2004, when he murdered five women in a village in the Mansky District. Zamanov killed them with the help of improvised weaponry. In all cases, the criminal fled the scene, taking all valuables and gold jewellery from the victims. In addition, the investigation found that Zamanov, who was living in the Beryozovsky District, had been in sexual relationships with two sisters who were minors.

Zamanov was characterized by his unpredictability and extreme cruelty - 6 of the 14 murders he committed all in one day. As a murder weapon, he used improvised items - stones, knives, victims' clothing. He never planned the murders and attacked at random, laughing at his victims while abusing them (especially the women). Among Zamanov's motives were resentment, anger and a strong and sudden irrational hatred for the victims. Rape was only an additional motive and did not always take place.

Zamanov's last killing spree was the six murders in one day, which occurred in a summer cottage. Witnesses were able to describe a man of Asian appearance, and the militsiya had the opportunity to make a facial composite, indicating important features. Meanwhile, the killer's talkativeness caught up to him - he told about the murders to his female partner, who filed a complaint to the authorities. He resisted during his arrest.

He did not admit guilt even at the trial, continuing to claim that he was provoked in each case. In 2006, he was sentenced to 25 years in prison. However, the relatives of the victims and the regional prosecutor's office appealed this decision. In 2008, he was sentenced to life imprisonment by the court, to be served in a special regime colony. All instances of the verdict remained unchanged. Zamanov is serving his sentence in the Polar Owl colony in the Yamalo-Nenets Autonomous Okrug.

== See also ==
- List of Russian serial killers
- List of serial killers by number of victims
