= Nikolai Ageyev =

Russian serial killer (born 1974)

- Born: Nikolai Aleksandrovich Ageyev; 1 May 1974 (age 52); Kurgan, Kurgan Oblast, RSFSR
- Conviction: Murder x4
- Penalty: Murder: 16 years imprisonment (2006); Life imprisonment (2018); Life imprisonment (2024); Other crimes: "Several years" imprisonment (2003)

Details
- Victims: 4
- Span of crimes: 2006–2024
- Country: Russia
- States: Sverdlovsk, Yamalo-Nenets
- Date apprehended: 13 September 2018
- Imprisoned at: Polar Owl, Kharp, Yamalo-Nenets Autonomous Okrug

Nikolai Aleksandrovich Ageyev (Russian: Николай Александрович Агеев; born 1 May 1974) is a Russian serial killer. Originally convicted of killing a cellmate while serving a sentence for robbery, he was later paroled. A few years later, he embarked on a crime spree that resulted in him killing an elderly woman and a young girl in 2018.

Convicted and sentenced to life imprisonment, he was incarcerated at a special regime colony, but still managed to kill another cellmate in 2024. For this second crime, he was given another life sentence and subsequently designated as one of the most dangerous criminals in the Urals.

== Early life and first murder ==
Little is known about Ageyev's early life. Born on 1 May 1974 in Kurgan, Kurgan Oblast, he began living a criminal lifestyle in the early 2000s by committing robberies, some of which turned violent. In 2003, he was convicted of a robbery and assault charge, receiving a sentence of several years imprisonment. That same year, he was transferred to serve the sentence at a penal colony in Sverdlovsk Oblast.

In 2006, while still incarcerated, Ageyev murdered his cellmate out of apparent personal animosity. He was later convicted of this murder and had 16 years added to his original sentence. In October 2017, he was transferred to serve his sentence in Kurgan, but by July 2018, he was released on parole for exemplary behavior. However, as he had nowhere to go, he instead moved to Yekaterinburg in Sverdlovsk Oblast, where he lived as a vagrant.

== Crime spree ==
=== First killing ===
During the first half of August 2018, Ageyev robbed and assaulted several acquaintances and passers-by. On August 17, he went to the apartment of an elderly woman he had met the day prior, located on Sortirovochnaya Street. He arrived at about 22:40, after which he immediately attacked the woman, knocking her down to the ground. He then grabbed her by the neck and choked her, before striking her at least 11 times on the head with a hammer and an axe. Ageyev then stole 13,000 rubles from the apartment, after which he fled.

=== Chelyabinsk assaults ===
Fearing criminal prosecution, he fled to Chelyabinsk, Chelyabinsk Oblast, where he committed additional robberies over the following month. All of the attacks were done at night and against food vendors, whom Ageyev struck with a metal adjustable wrench he carried with him at all times. After striking his victim, he would open the cash register and steal the money, then flee the area and spend all the money on alcohol and food.

Ageyev committed the first such attack in mid-August, when he approached a female fruit vendor near house No. 62 on Kirov Street from behind. He tore off her apron and stole 14,000 rubles before fleeing. Two passers-by attempted to catch him, but upon noticing them, Ageyev took out a hammer and threatened them, frightening his pursuers off. On 8 September, Ageyev broke into the Fruit and Vegetables store on Solnechnaya Street, where he attacked a salesperson. He struck the victim at least 5 times with his wrench, causing the woman to fall to the floor. After that, Ageyev stole items and food worth at least 20,000 rubles.

Acting in a similar manner, on 10 September, Ageyev attacked the vendor of the "Cigarettes" kiosk on Molodogvardeitsev Street, hitting her on the head at least 4 times. The victim suffered severe injuries, including a fracture of the vault and base of the skull, as well as a fractured arm and several hematomas. In total, he had stolen at least 28,000 rubles worth of items and money. After his arrest, Ageyev revealed that he carried the wrench around with him with the intent that if he was ever arrested, he could explain it away as him being a construction worker and that was part of his toolkit.

By mid-September, as the search for the then-unknown serial robber was intensifying across Chelyabinsk, he was eventually identified as the prime suspect. Before he could be arrested, however, Ageyev fled the city and moved to Kamensk-Uralsky, Sverdlovsk Oblast.

=== Kamensk-Uralsky murder ===
On the evening of 11 September 2018, Ageyev was hanging around a Krasnoe & Beloe store when he befriended a 36-year-old man. His new acquaintance offered him a drink, to which he agreed, after which they bought a bottle of vodka in the store and went to the man's apartment, located in a five-storey building on Aluminievaya Street. The man's 10-year-old stepdaughter was also in the apartment at the time, and his wife was working the night shift. For several hours, Ageyev and his friend drank alcohol together, but at some point, Ageyev decided that he would rob the place and rape the little girl. When he was eventually asked to leave, he instead took out his wrench and struck the man at least three times on the head.

After making sure that he was knocked unconscious, Ageyev proceeded to sexually abuse the 10-year-old girl for a prolonged period of time. During this time, the neighbors heard strange noises coming from the apartment, but did not notify the police for unclear reasons. Having completed the rape, Ageyev took the girl to the bathroom and threw her into the bathtub, put the water on and forcibly held her head underwater until she drowned.

He then ransacked the apartment, stealing a total of 19,000 rubles before leaving. Unbeknownst to him, the man he had assaulted survived the injuries, and once his wife returned in the morning, she immediately notified the authorities and an ambulance.

== Arrest, trial and imprisonment ==
Soon after the murder, Ageyev hitchhiked out of Kamensk-Uralsky and went back to Chelyabinsk. After analyzing the surveillance footage taken from the store he and the man had bought the bottle of vodka in, he was quickly identified as the prime suspect and put on a wanted list. The severity of the crime caused a great stir in the public, and it was publicized all over the Sverdlovsk Oblast.

Two days later, law enforcement officers detained Ageyev at a railway station in Chelyabinsk and he was transported back to Yekaterinburg. While awaiting trial in Pre-Trial Detention Center No. 1, he spontaneously confessed to the two murders and the other crimes he had committed - because of this, the case was handed over to Mikhail Borodin, the head of the Sverdlovsk Oblast's Main Directorate of the Ministry of Internal Affairs.

Over the following weeks, Ageyev was transferred several times between the various cities he had committed crimes in to reconstruct what had happened. In the end, he was charged with multiple counts of murder, robbery, attempted murder, child sexual abuse and multiple related charges. Once he was found sane to stand trial, his case was transferred to the court on 20 June 2019. Throughout the proceedings, he showed no remorse for what he had done, and covered his face with a medical mask and a black hat.

On 18 September 2019, the Sverdlovsk Regional Court found Ageyev guilty on all counts and sentenced him to life imprisonment.

=== 2024 prison murder ===
Following his conviction, he was transferred to serve his sentence at the Polar Owl Colony, located in the Yamalo-Nenets Autonomous Okrug. He had no notable incidents until April 2024, when he developed a hostile relationship with his cellmate. Because of this, on 20 April, Ageyev grabbed a piece of cement and struck his cellmate while he was lying down, hitting the man approximately 39 times. The victim was rushed to the prison hospital, where he died after suffering from severe agony and shock brought on from the assault. The victim was later identified as 47-year-old Chechen militant Arsan Mukayev, who was serving a life sentence for being complicit in the murder of 13 Russian soldiers during the Second Chechen War.

In the subsequent investigation, Ageyev admitted that he killed Mukayev because he simply disliked him, and said that he got the piece of cement from somewhere within the colony shortly before the actual murder. On 12 December, he was found guilty of the murder and given a second life term.

== See also ==
- List of Russian serial killers
- List of serial killers active in the 2020s
