= Sergey Zastynchanu =

Moldovan serial killer

- Born: Sergey Vladimirovich Zastynchanu; Sergiu Zastânceanu; 1979 (age 46–47); Fălești, Moldovan SSR, Soviet Union
- Other name: "The Koptevsky Maniac"
- Convictions: 4x counts of murder robbery
- Penalty: Life Imprisonment

Details
- Victims: 4
- Span of crimes: June – October 2004
- Country: Russia
- State: Moscow
- Date apprehended: October 2004
- Imprisoned at: Polar Owl, Kharp, Yamalo-Nenets Autonomous Okrug

Sergey Vladimirovich Zastynchanu (Romanian: Sergiu Zastânceanu, Russian: Серге́й Влади́мирович Застынча́ну; born 1979), known as The Koptevsky Maniac (Russian: Коптевский маньяк) is a Moldovan serial killer who operated mainly in the north of Moscow.

== Biography ==
He was born in 1980 in Moldova and grew up in the small town of Fălești, where he graduated from high school. In 1996, he was forced to leave for Russia to find work as a builder. On 10 June 2004, a 70-year-old woman and her sister were killed with a kitchen knife in their apartment in the Moscow district of Koptevo. A month later, a 69-year-old woman was killed in her apartment along Horoshevskoe highway. The attacker robbed one victim of 75 thousand rubles, and the other of 15 thousand rubles. Almost all the valuable items were left untouched, but it was later found that the killer only came for the money. Three months later, a criminal in the south-west of Moscow killed a single 67-year-old lady in her apartment. During the investigation it was revealed that the apartment had recently been repaired. Neighbors reported that a young man had been working on repairs there - a foreign worker from Moldova. The builders working with him later contacted him.

The criminal was detained and searched, during which 60 thousand rubles as well as jewelry were found on him. Under the weight of the evidence, Zastynchanu acknowledged his guilt. The forensic psychiatric examination showed that at the time of the murders, he was imputed and reported his actions. Zastynchanu demanded his case to be examined with the participation of the jury. The jury found him guilty of the murder of four people and robbery attacks. The jury found that the criminal does not deserve leniency. On 7 June 2005, the Moscow City Court found Sergey Zastynchanu guilty under articles 105 (murder of two or more persons) and 162 (robbery) of the Criminal Code of the Russian Federation and, on the basis of a combination of crimes, sentenced him to life imprisonment with a serving sentence in a correctional colony with a special regime. The Supreme Court of the Russian Federation left the verdict of the previous sentence unchanged.

== See also ==
- List of Russian serial killers

== Links ==
- Гражданин Молдавии сел пожизненно за убийство четырёх женщин в Москве
- Приезжий из Молдавии убил четырёх москвичек
- Гастарбайтер получил пожизненное за убийство четырёх москвичек
- Серийный убийца Сергей Застынчану
