= Synya =

River in Siberia, Russia

Synya Сыня
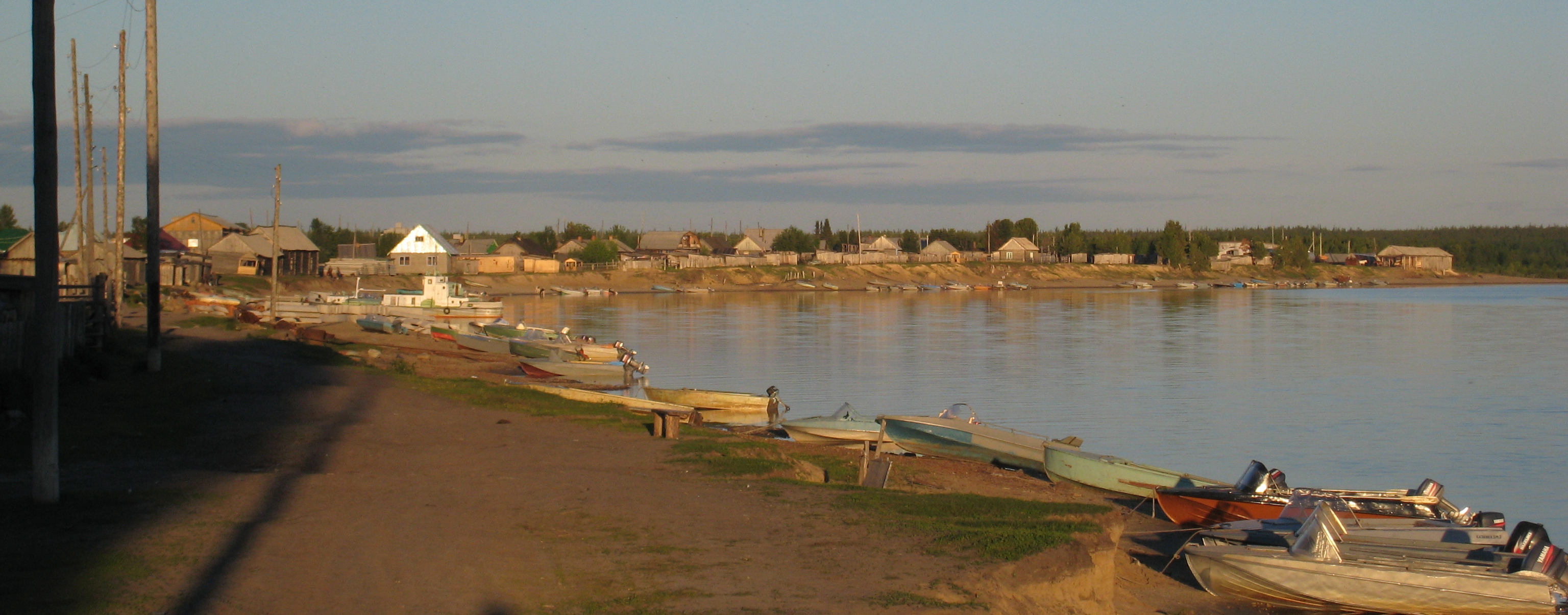
- View of the Synya at Ovgort

- Mouth location in Yamalo-Nenets Autonomous Okrug, Russia

Location
- Country: Russia

Physical characteristics
- Source: Polar Urals
  - coordinates: 65°28′16″N 63°13′48″E
  - elevation: 53 m (174 ft)
- Mouth: Ob
  - location: Malaya Ob
  - coordinates: 66°12′55″N 64°49′15″E
  - elevation: 5 m (16 ft)
- Length: 217 km (135 mi) (304 km (189 mi))
- Basin size: 13,500 km^{2} (5,200 sq mi)
- Discharge
  - average: 96 m^{3}/s (3,400 cu ft/s) (88 km (55 mi) from the mouth)

Basin features
- Progression: Ob→ Kara Sea

The Synya (Russian: Сыня) is a river in Yamalo-Nenets Autonomous Okrug, Russia. The river is 217 kilometres (135 mi) long —304 km (189 mi) from the source of the Mokraya Synya at its head— and has a catchment area of 13,500 square kilometres (5,200 sq mi).

The Synya flows across the Shuryshkarsky District. It is navigable for 90 kilometres (56 mi), between its mouth in the Ob and Ovgort village.

== Course ==
The Synya is a left tributary of the Ob river. It has its sources at the confluence of the 20 km (12 mi) long Sukhaya Synya and the 87 km (54 mi) long Mokraya Synya, which flow from the eastern slopes of the Polar Urals. The river flows initially southwards, then bends and flows eastwards, within a wide floodplain located at the northwestern end of the West Siberian Plain. Finally it meets the left bank of the Malaya Ob, an arm of the Ob, about 488 km (303 mi) from its mouth.

=== Tributaries ===
The main tributaries of the Synya are the 178 km (111 mi) long Lesmiyogan (Лесмиёган), the 163 km (101 mi) long Nesyogan (Несъёган) and the 178 km (111 mi) long Bolshoy Tukshin (Большой Тукшин) from the right. The river is fed predominantly by snow and is frozen between October and May.

== Fauna ==
The main fish species in the river are omul, peled, broad whitefish, sig, and tugun.

== See also ==
- List of rivers of Russia
