= Katravozh =

Katravozh Катравож
- Location in Russia Katravozh (Russia)
- Coordinates: 66°19′32″N 66°6′13″E
- Country: Russia
- Federal subject: Yamalo-Nenets Autonomous Okrug
- District: Priuralsky

Area
  - Total: 0.413 km^{2} (0.159 sq mi)
- Elevation: 22 m (72 ft)

Population (2019)
  - Total: 779
  - Density: 1,890/km^{2} (4,890/sq mi)
- Time zone: UTC+5 (YEKT)
- Postal code: 629624

Katravozh or Sobskiye (Russian: Катравож) is a village along the Ob river in Yamalo-Nenets Autonomous Okrug, Russia with a subarctic Köppen climate classification and record high temperatures of 34 °C compared to record low temperatures of -50 °C. Katravozh's population has decreased from 824 in 2002 to 779 in 2019 and its population is connected to the outside world via flights to Salekhard.
