= Shuryshkarsky District =

Shuryshkarsky District Шурышкарский район (Russian)
- District
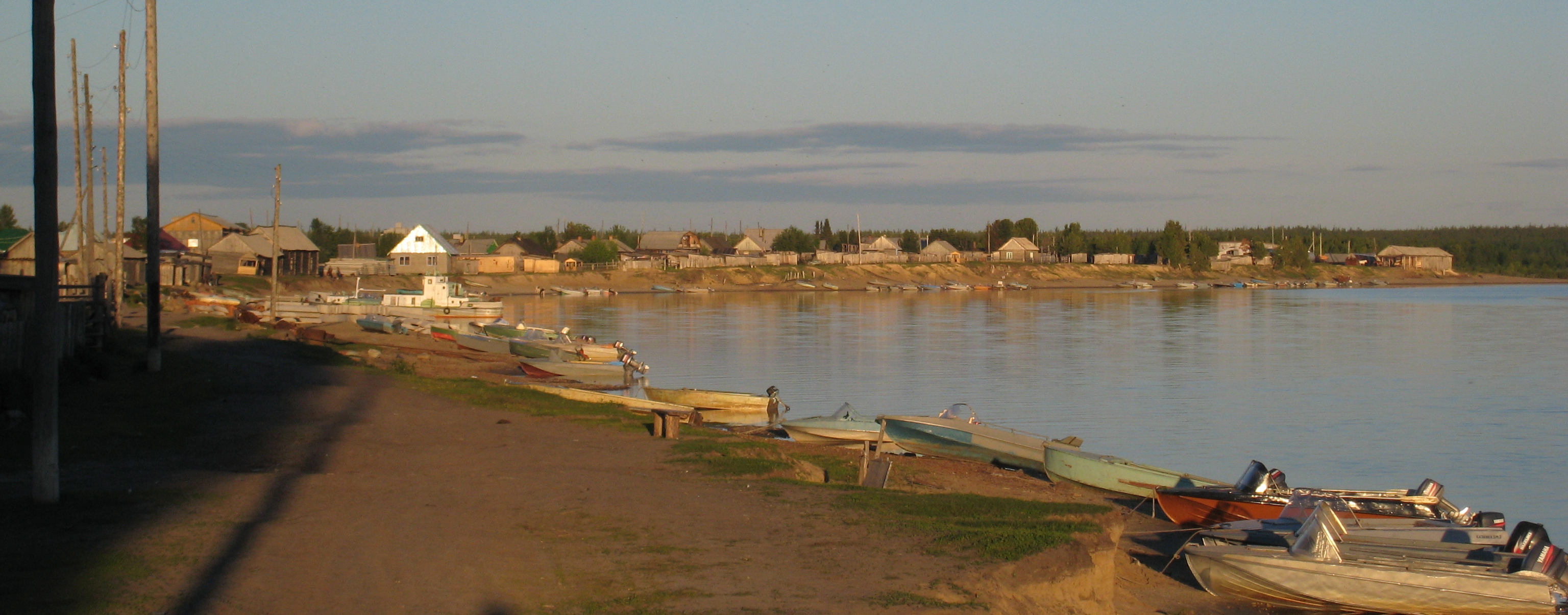
- Hamlet (selo) Ovgort by the Synya river, Shuryshkharsky District

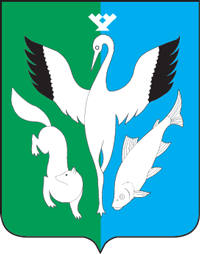
- Flag Coat of arms
- Location of Shuryshkarsky District in Yamalo-Nenets Autonomous Okrug
- Coordinates: 65°23′53″N 64°41′55″E
- Country: Russia
- Federal subject: Yamalo-Nenets Autonomous Okrug
- Established: 1930
- Administrative center: Muzhi

Area
  - Total: 54,016 km^{2} (20,856 sq mi)

Population (2010 Census)
  - Total: 9,814
  - Density: 0.1817/km^{2} (0.4706/sq mi)
  - Urban: 0%
  - Rural: 100%

Administrative structure
  - Inhabited localities: 27 rural localities

Municipal structure
  - Municipally incorporated as: Shuryshkarsky Municipal District
  - Municipal divisions: 0 urban settlements, 7 rural settlements
- Time zone: UTC+5 (MSK+2)
- OKTMO ID: 71926000
- Website: https://admmuji.yanao.ru

Shuryshkarsky District (Russian: Шурышкарский райо́н; Khanty: Ӆорвош район, Łorvoš rajon) is an administrative and municipal district (raion), one of the seven in Yamalo-Nenets Autonomous Okrug of Tyumen Oblast, Russia. It is located in the southwest of the autonomous okrug. The area of the district is 54,016 square kilometers (20,856 sq mi). Its administrative center is the rural locality (a selo) of Muzhi. Population: 9,814 (2010 Census); 9,559 (2002 census); 9,001 (1989 Soviet census). The population of Muzhi accounts for 36.8% of the district's total population.

Ethnic composition (2021):

- Khanty – 48.6%
- Russians – 29%
- Komi – 13.8%
- Nenets – 1.9%
- Tatars – 1.1%
- Ukrainians – 1%
- Others – 4.6%

== Geography ==
Mount Payer, part of the Polar Urals and the highest point of the okrug, is located in the district.
