= Firuz Aituganov =

Tajikistani serial killer

- Born: Firuz Hidirovich Aituganov; 1990 (age 35–36); Tajik SSR
- Convictions: Murder x4 Attempted murder x1 Rape x1 Robbery x2
- Penalty: Life imprisonment

Details
- Victims: 4
- Span of crimes: March – July 2011
- Country: Russia
- State: Sverdlovsk
- Date apprehended: July 23, 2011
- Imprisoned at: Polar Owl Colony

Firuz Hidirovich Aituganov (Russian: Фируз Хидирович Айтуганов; Tajik: Фирӯз Ҳидирович Айтуғонов; born 1990) is a Tajikistani serial killer and rapist who raped and murdered four women in Yekaterinburg, Russia between March and July 2011. After his would-be fifth and sixth victim survived, he was detained, convicted and sentenced to life imprisonment, which he is serving at the Polar Owl Colony.

== Early life ==
Little is known about Aituganov's early life. Born in the Tajik SSR, he was described as a "loser" in his social life and academic achievements, failing in finding a girlfriend or completing his education. Desperate to find employment, he moved to Russia illegally in early 2011, settling in Yekaterinburg. However, his lack of skills and inability to speak the language resulted in him being denied numerous jobs, with him eventually settling to work as a security guard at a parking lot. Aituganov's employment was not officially registered due to his status as an illegal immigrant. Despite his newfound employment, he had problems at work, with money and adapting to the big city life, this greatly impacted Aituganov, who decided that he would solve all of his problems with violence.

== Murders ==
On March 27, 2011, Aituganov noticed 32-year-old Marina Alexandrovna walking down the street, returning to her apartment after visiting some friends in the city. He began stalking her, eventually subduing her and dragging her to a nearby abandoned building, where he proceeded to rape and strangle her. After killing her, he rummaged through her corpse, stealing all her money and valuables. A few days later, Alexandrovna's body was located, with no clue to whom had killed her.

In the following three months, three other women were killed in a similar fashion in the Leninsky City and Chkalovsky Districts: all had been stalked, raped and murdered in isolated areas of the city, with the apparent motive being robbery. Like Alexandrovna, the second and third victim had been strangled, but the fourth had been killed with a brick. By this time, rumors of a serial offender were spreading panic among the residents, and law enforcement began looking for a suspect. Not long after, two more women would be attacked, but they managed to evade death.

The first victim, although she was raped and robbed, managed to flee, leaving behind her handbag with an expensive mobile phone and 15,000 rubles in it. Aituganov hid for a couple days, but then attacked again, unsuccessfully trying to rape another woman, who managed to fight him off, losing her cellphone in the process. Thanks to her witness statements, the authorities soon arrested him.

== Trial and imprisonment ==
After his capture, Aituganov's DNA was examined, connecting him to the four murders and the two attacks. He was brought to trial with these charges, and was supposed to be charged with three additional rapes, but since there wasn't enough evidence, those were dropped. At trial, Aituganov was given an interpreter whom translated to him in Tajik, since he couldn't speak Russian. On June 1, 2011, he was found guilty and sentenced to life imprisonment, and upon hearing the verdict, Aituganov burst into tears. He was sent off the Polar Owl Colony to serve his sentence. All of his subsequent appeals to the Supreme Court of Russia were promptly denied, and he remains incarcerated to this day.

== See also ==
- List of Russian serial killers
