= Aksarka =

Aksarka Аксарка
- Selo
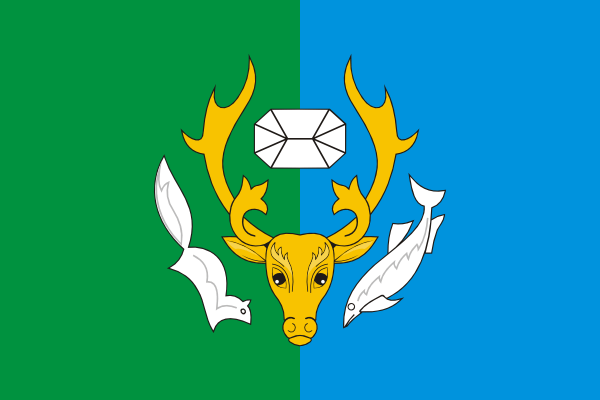
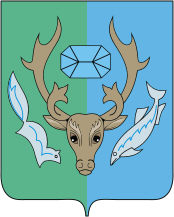
- Flag Coat of arms
- Interactive map of Aksarka
- Location of Aksarka Aksarka (Yamalo-Nenets Autonomous Okrug)
- Coordinates: 66°33′30″N 67°47′35″E
- Country: Russia
- Federal subject: Yamalo-Nenets Autonomous Okrug
- Administrative district: Priuralsky District
- SettlementSelsoviet: Aksarkovskoye Settlement
- Elevation: 13 m (43 ft)

Population (2010 Census)
  - Total: 3,133
  - Estimate (2021): 4,352 (+38.9%)

Administrative status
  - Capital of: Priuralsky District, Aksarkovskoye Settlement

Municipal status
  - Municipal district: Priuralsky Municipal District
  - Rural settlement: Aksarkovskoye Rural Settlement
  - Capital of: Priuralsky Municipal District, Aksarkovskoye Rural Settlement
- Time zone: UTC+5 (MSK+2)
- Postal code: 629620
- OKTMO ID: 71938000101

Aksarka (Russian: Аксарка; Nenets: Хоя’-Сале, Hojaꜧ-Sale) is a rural locality (a selo) and the administrative center of Priuralsky District of Yamalo-Nenets Autonomous Okrug, Russia. Population: 3,133 (2010 census); 2,569 (2002 census); 2,365 (1989 Soviet census).

Aksarka is located on the Arctic Circle
