= FKU IK-3, Kharp =

Corrective labor colony in Yamalo-Nenets Autonomous Okrug, Russia

Polar Wolf (FKU IK-3)
- Interactive map of Polar Wolf (FKU IK-3)
- Location: Kharp, Yamalo-Nenets Autonomous Okrug, Russia; 66°49′07″N 65°47′44″E
- Status: Operational
- Opened: 21 August 1961
- Managed by: Federal Penitentiary Service
- Warden: Colonel Vadim Konstantinovich Kalinin

FKU IK-3 (Russian: ФКУ ИК-3) (Note: 'FKU' stands for Federal Governmental Institution (федеральное казённое учреждение, federalnoye kazyonnoye uchrezhdeniye) and IK stands for Corrective Colony (исправительная колония, ispravitelnaya koloniya)) of the Federal Penitentiary Service of Russia for the Yamalo-Nenets Autonomous Okrug, also known as Polar Wolf (Russian: Полярный волк, romanized: Polyarnyy volk) or Yamskaya Troika (Ямская тройка), is a men's maximum security corrective colony in the town of Kharp in the Priuralsky District in the Yamalo-Nenets Autonomous Okrug. It has an occupancy limit of 1,085 people (1,050 by another source).

== History ==
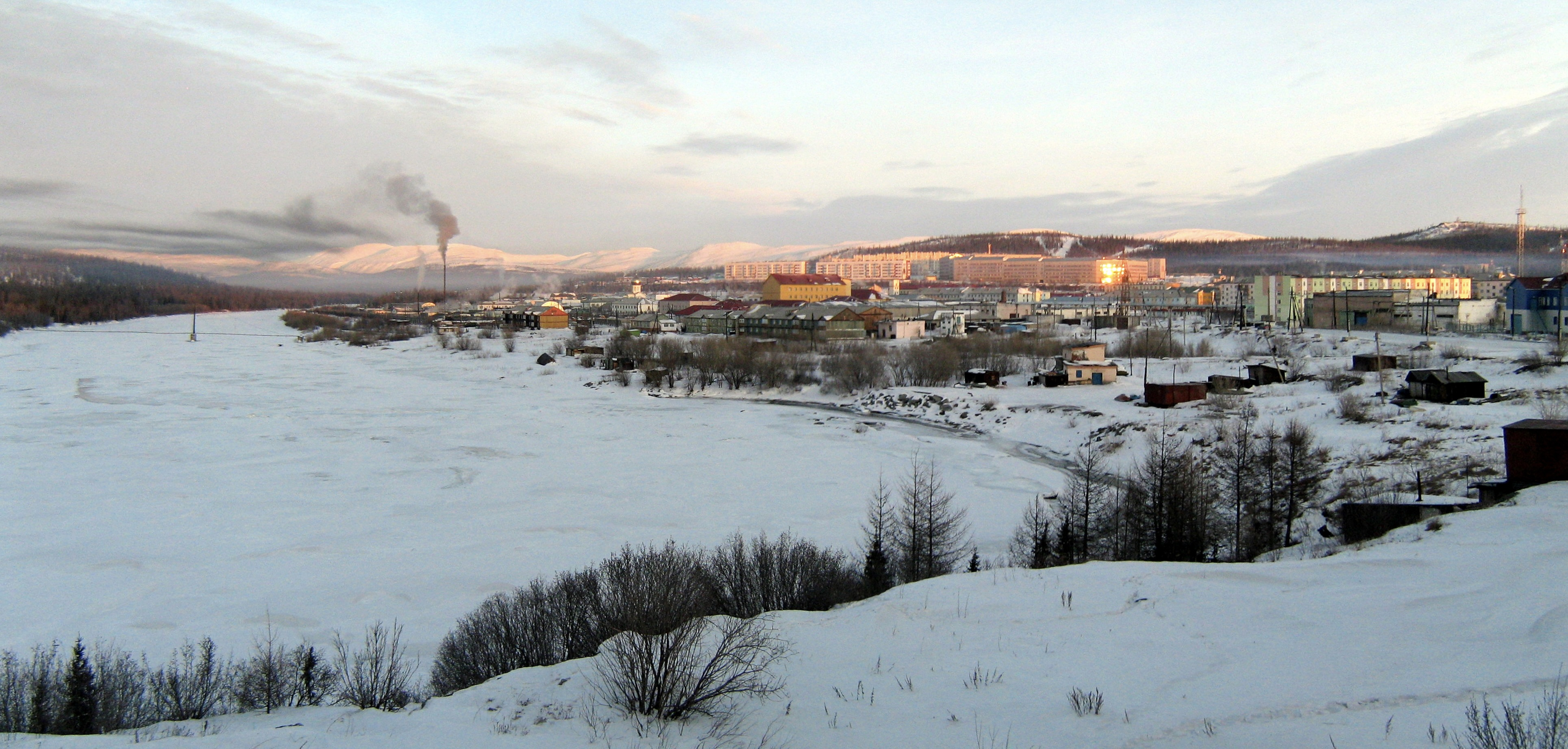
View of the city of Kharp from the south; IK-3 is located to the immediate right and rear of the smokestack.

The city of Kharp was built by Gulag prisoners during the Stalin era.

The colony was founded on 21 August 1961 on the former camp unit of the 501st Gulag construction site. It was initially known as "YATs-34/3".

In 1964, the first residential buildings for convicts, a medical unit, a boiler room, a bathhouse, a laundry, a dormitory for the colony-settlement section, and a central checkpoint building were built. From 1966 to July 1970, the convicts worked in quarries, loading sand and gravel for filling the railway track. In 1964, the first permanent building was built in the village. In 1966, a canteen, then buildings, a headquarters building and a fire station were built. The first batch of especially dangerous convicted repeat offenders was brought to the colony in 1967.

In 1971, warehouses, an icehouse, and shelters to garage the institution's equipment were built. Since 1985, IK-3 has been actively developing. The convicts held there were employed in manufacturing for minimum wage. In 1999, the Temple of St. Sergius of Radonezh was opened, built by convicts.

In 1998, reform of the penal system began, and responsibility for the institution moved from the Ministry of Internal Affairs to the Ministry of Justice. In 1999, the institution came under the direct control of the Department of Execution of Punishments for the Yamalo-Nenets Autonomous Okrug. It was renamed from "YaTs-34/3" (ЯЦ-34/3) to "Institution OG-98/3" (Russian: Учреждение ОГ-98/3, romanized: Uchrezhdeniye OG-98/3).

In 2002, a section for general regime prisoners was created in the institution. In July 2006, a high-security section was opened in the colony in converted residential buildings No. 4, 5 and 6. In November 2006, a colony-settlement section was opened. In October 2010, general and strict regime sections were ended, and convicts from these sections were sent to serve their sentences in other regions.

In 2004, the institution was renamed to "FGU IK-3 Federal Penitentiary Service of Russia for the Yamal-Nenets Autonomous Okrug" (ФГУ ИК-3 УФСИН России по ЯНАО, FGU IK-3 UFSIN Rossii po YANAO). Since June 2008, it has been known as "FGU IK-3 Federal Penitentiary Service of Russia for the Yamal-Nenets Autonomous Okrug" (ФБУ ИК-3 УФСИН России по ЯНАО, FKU IK-3 UFSIN Rossii po YANAO).

On 21 February 2024, the UK government placed sanctions on six individuals in charge of the prison at the time of Alexei Navalny's death.

On 23 February 2024, the US government placed sanctions on three individuals: Colonel Vadim Konstantinovich Kalinin, warden of Penal Colony IK-3; Igor Borisovich Rakitin, Yamalo-Nenets regional head of the Federal Penitentiary Service of Russia; and Valeriy Gennadevich Boyarinev, Deputy Director of the Federal Penitentiary Service of Russia, who had oversight of Penal Colony IK-3 at the time of Alexei Navalny's death. Boyarinev was subsequently promoted to Colonel General by Vladimir Putin.

== Conditions ==
=== Living accommodations ===
The conditions at Polar Wolf are known to be some of the worst in the Russian Federal Penitentiary System. Prisoners described "unbearable cold, repulsive food, unsanitary conditions and constant beatings". The worst part of the prison was the freezing nights. Prisoners reported that the prison had no central heat and instead relied on small radiators located on the floor. In some cases, cells had no radiators and only had radiators painted on the wall.

=== Punishment Cells ===
The prison reportedly has one to two dozen punishment/solitary confinement cells. Prominent Russian opposition figure and political prisoner Alexei Navalny spent up to 27 nights in a punishment cell with no access to the outside world.

=== Psychological impact ===
According to prisoners, Polar Wolf was "a system devised to break the human spirit, by making survival depend on total and unconditional obedience to the will of guards". The prison authorities relied on a system of informants, triggering paranoia and anxiety and making prisoners unable to trust anyone or have meaningful social interaction. One prisoner said "There is no sense of community" which typically keeps prisoners going in Russian prisons. Several former prisoners interviewed by The New York Times said they still struggled with mental illness years after release.

== Notable prisoners ==
- Platon Lebedev served 8 years in IK-3 in the Yukos case.
- Alexei Navalny was imprisoned in IK-3 from December 2023 until his death at the age of 47 on 16 February 2024.

== See also ==
- Polar Owl – another penal colony in the town of Kharp
- Prisons in Russia
