= Alexander Pichushkin =

Russian serial killer

- Александр Пичушкин
- Pichushkin in 2007
- Born: Alexander Yuryevich Pichushkin; 9 April 1974 (age 52); Mytishchi, Moscow Oblast, Russian SFSR, USSR
- Other names: The Bittsa Park Maniac; The Chessboard Killer
- Motive: To kill 64 people, the number of squares on a chessboard; To surpass Andrei Chikatilo in number of victims; Theorised frontal cortex damage from childhood injury
- Penalty: Life imprisonment

Details
- Victims: 49–60 killed 3 injured
- Span of crimes: 27 July 1992; 17 May 2001 – 13 June 2006
- Country: Russia
- Weapons: Hammer, crowbar, picket fence, pen gun, rope, vodka bottle
- Date apprehended: 16 June 2006

Alexander Yuryevich Pichushkin (Russian: Алекса́ндр Ю́рьевич Пичу́шкин; born 9 April 1974), also known as the Chessboard Killer (Убийца с шахматной доской) and the Bittsa Park Maniac (Битцевский маньяк), is a Russian serial killer and former grocery store clerk who is believed to have killed at least forty-nine people, and possibly as many as sixty, between 1992 and 2006. Pichushkin was active in Moscow's Bittsa Park, where a number of the victims' bodies were found. On 29 October 2007, he was sentenced to life imprisonment. At time of imprisonment, he was unmarried with no children.

== Early life ==
Pichushkin was born on 9 April 1974 in Mytishchi, Moscow Oblast, Russian SFSR, Soviet Union, and grew up on 2 Khersonskaya Street in Moscow proper. He lived there with his mother Natalia Elmouradovna, his younger half-sister, her husband, and their son in a two-bedroom apartment on the fifth floor. Their apartment building was a six-minute walk from the north end of Bittsa Park.

Pichushkin is remembered to have been an initially sociable child. However, this changed following an incident in which he fell backwards off a swing, which then struck him in the forehead as it swung back. Experts speculated that this event damaged the frontal cortex of Pichushkin's brain; such damage is known to produce poor impulse regulation and a tendency towards aggression. Since Pichushkin was still a child, the damage would have been more severe, as a child's forehead provides only a fraction of the protection for the brain compared to an adult's. Following this accident, Pichushkin frequently became hostile and impulsive.

Due to his behaviour, Pichushkin's mother decided to transfer him from the mainstream school he had been attending to one for children with learning disabilities. Prior to this transfer, children from the mainstream school were known to have physically and verbally bullied Pichushkin, referring to him as "that retard". This abuse served to intensify Pichushkin's anger. Upon reaching early adolescence, his maternal grandfather recognized that Pichushkin was highly intelligent and felt that his innate talents were being wasted, as he wasn't involved in any activities at home and the school he was enrolled in focused more on overcoming disability than on promoting achievement.

Pichushkin moved into his grandfather's home and was encouraged to pursue intellectual pursuits outside of school. The deepest of these interests was chess. Pichushkin was taught how to play, and after demonstrating his ability was introduced to the exhibition games against elderly men who played publicly in Bittsa Park. An outstanding chess player, Pichushkin found a channel for his aggression when dominating the chessboard in all of his games. However, he continued to be bullied by mainstream school children and suffered an emotional blow when, toward the end of his adolescence, his grandfather died. Pichushkin was left to return to his mother's home, after which he enrolled as a student.

According to reports, the death of his grandfather greatly affected Pichushkin. In an effort to both dull the pain of the loss as well as to calm his severe aggressive tendencies, he began to consume large quantities of vodka. He continued to play chess both at home and in Bittsa Park, now joining the other men in drinking vodka, though unlike them he could play without being greatly affected by the alcohol. It was at this time that Pichushkin began to develop a more sinister hobby that, at the time, remained unknown to anyone: whenever he knew he was going to come into contact with children, he would take a video camera along and proceed to threaten them. On one occasion that has since been made public, he held a young child by one leg, upside down, and said to the camera: "You are in my power now... I am going to drop you from the window... and you will fall fifteen meters to your death..." He then watched these videos repeatedly to reaffirm his power. However, by 1992, this practice had become insufficient to satisfy his urges.

== Murders ==
Russian media have speculated that Pichushkin was motivated, in part, by a macabre competition with another notorious Russian serial killer, Andrei Chikatilo, who was convicted of killing fifty-two children and young women over a twelve-year period. Pichushkin has said his aim was to kill sixty-four people — the number of squares on a chessboard. He later recanted this statement, saying that he would have continued killing indefinitely had he not been stopped. Another report stated that after reaching his earlier goal, he intended to buy an international checkers board and kill one-hundred.

=== First victim (July 1992) ===
Pichushkin's first murder occurred on 27 July 1992, when he was aged 18. Pichushkin arranged to meet his classmate, Mikhail Odïtchuk, in Bittsa Park to jointly hatch a plan to kill sixty-four people. However, when they arrived at the meeting point, Odïtchuk changed his mind and told Pichushkin that he no longer wanted to take action. Feeling teased by his best friend, Pichushkin strangled him with a rope and threw his body in a sewer entrance at Bittsa Park, then returned to his mother's apartment a short distance away. The body was never found.

After Odïtchuk's disappearance, Moscow police opened an investigation. The Chief Investigator on the case was Andrei Suprunenko. Witness testimony provided to the police stated that Odïtchuk was last seen with Pichushkin, walking in the direction of the park. Pichushkin was arrested at his mother's home on 30 July and taken to Moscow police station for questioning. When asked about his schedule on the day of Odïtchuk's disappearance, Pichushkin confirmed having met with Odïtchuk but claimed to have left him unharmed in the park. With no evidence tying him to the disappearance, Pichushkin was released.

Pichushkin ceased killing for several years until 1996 when Russia placed a moratorium on the death penalty. This reignited Pichushkin's interest in killing.

=== "Sewers" period (May 2001–September 2005) ===
On 17 May 2001, Pichushkin was in Bittsa Park playing chess with a 52-year-old man named Yevgeny Pronin. At the end of their game, Pichushkin invited Pronin to take a walk with him, claiming it was the anniversary of his dog's death and that he wanted to visit the grave in Bittsa Park. Pronin accompanied him to an isolated area in Bittsa Park, whereupon Pichushkin pulled out a bottle of vodka and offered him a drink. The men made a toast to the dog, after which Pichushkin struck Pronin in the head with the bottle. Once Pronin was dead, Pichushkin threw his body into a nearby well.

Between May 2001 and September 2005, Pichushkin attacked thirty-six victims; three of his victims survived their injuries. Pichushkin would approach his victim in Bittsa Park (the vast majority of them elderly homeless people), offer to share a drink of vodka, and then kill them—typically by striking the back of their skull with a hammer or a bottle, although he was also alleged to have pushed his victims into the sewage canal to drown. Occasionally, he would then "sign" the corpse by impaling the victim's skull with sticks or an empty vodka bottle. Allegedly Pichushkin is said to have used Golden Magic vodka, which at the time cost roughly 38 rubles equivalent to one euro, on the auspices that he did not want to "spoil" anyone.

=== "Open" period (October 2005–June 2006) ===
From October 2005 to his final murder in 2006, Pichushkin's modus operandi changed. He would kill his victims by repeated blows to the head with a hammer, and would then push a vodka bottle into the gaping wound in their skulls. He would always attack from behind in order to take the victim by surprise and avoid spilling blood on his clothes. Ten of his victims lived in the same four-building complex on Khersonskaya street where Pichushkin also lived: four victims were from 2 Khersonskaya, two were from 4 Khersonskaya, three were from 6 Khersonskaya, and one was from 8 Khersonskaya.

== Arrest ==
In June 2006, Pichushkin offered to go for a walk with his 36-year-old coworker, Marina Moskalyova. Though she was reportedly suspicious of him, Moskalyova agreed to go. Before she left, she wrote a note to her son letting him know she was with Pichushkin and left his phone number. Pichushkin was aware of the note but was undeterred. During a later interview, he was questioned why he committed the last murder, despite knowing he would likely be caught to which he stated, "it was kind of a suicide. I just couldn't go on. I was severely depressed at the time."

Moskalyova's body was discovered in Bittsa Park on 14 June 2006, complete with Pichushkin's trademark injuries. A Moscow Metro ticket found in her possession led authorities to review surveillance tape footage from the metro system, where she was filmed, just hours before her death, walking on a platform accompanied by Pichushkin. In a later interview, Pichushkin recounted, "I hit her several times with a hammer. She screamed and then fell backwards. She lay on her side."

Once apprehended, Pichushkin led police officers to the scenes of many of his crimes in Bittsa Park and demonstrated a keen recollection of how the murders were committed. He was filmed reenacting his crimes in great detail, a process which is a regular part of Russian criminal investigation. Pichushkin also revealed that some of the murders he committed were not done using his preferred method (hammer blows to the back of the head), but by throwing his victims down into the sewer lines beneath Bittsa Park (although one of his victims did survive this ordeal). Chief investigator Andrei Suprunenko stated in later interviews that the chessboard wherein Pichushkin was stated to keep track of his murders was an extension of his alleged, "chess genius," skills. The skills were nonsense.

Pichushkin claimed that deciding whether his victims should live or die made him feel like God. "In all cases I killed for only one reason. I killed in order to live, because when you kill, you want to live," he once said. "For me, life without murder is like life without food for you. I felt like the father of all these people, since it was me who opened the door for them to another world." In other interviews he stated, "Without the murders, my life would no longer have made sense. I needed it like oxygen to feel good. What should I have done instead? Grow cucumbers or go fishing? I sent people to another world without torturing them. I killed them so I could live myself."

== Trial and imprisonment ==
Pichushkin was convicted on 24 October 2007 of forty-nine murders and three attempted murders. He asked a Russian court to add an additional eleven victims to his body count, bringing his claimed death toll to sixty, and three surviving victims. During his trial, Pichushkin was housed in a glass cage for his own protection.

Upon conviction, Judge Vladimir Usov sentenced Pichushkin to life imprisonment, Pichushkin appealed his sentencing, claiming it was "too harsh" and asking for a reduction to twenty-five years. As of 2026, Pichushkin was spending his days in solitary confinement at the Arctic penal colony "Polar Owl".

== In popular culture ==
=== Books ===
- Harrington, Roger (2018). Alexander Pichushkin: The Shocking True Story of The Chessboard Killer. Amazon Digital Services LLC. ISBN 9781983033735.
- Kepler, Lars (2018). The Sandman. Penguin Random House LLC. ISBN 9780525433057.

=== Music ===
- The Finnish death metal band Torture Killer made a studio album, Sewers, dedicated to Pichushkin.

=== Television ===
- Serial Killers: Chessboard Killer (2009). The first series of the Discovery documentary is focused on the case of Alexander Pichushkin.

=== Podcasts ===
- My Favorite Murder covered Pichushkin's case in its 23rd episode titled "Making a Twenty-Thirderer".
- And That's Why We Drink did a two-part episode about Pichushkin titled "The Chess Board Killer".
- Crime, Conspiracy, Cults and Murder did an episode about Pichushkin titled "The Most Prolific Serial Killer You've Never Hear Of| The Chessboard Killer".

== See also ==
- List of Russian serial killers
- List of serial killers by number of victims
