= Muzhi, Yamalo-Nenets Autonomous Okrug =

Muzhi Мужи
- Selo
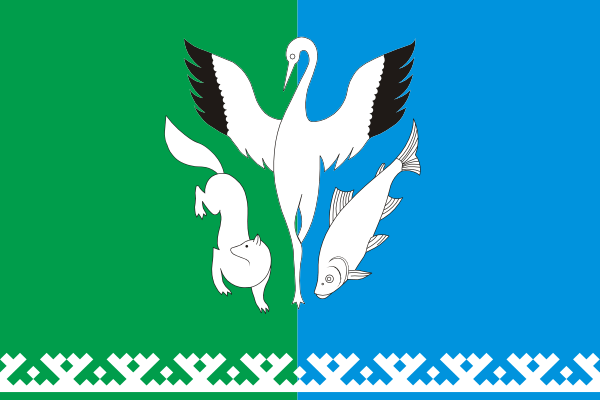
- Flag
- Interactive map of Muzhi
- Location of Muzhi Muzhi (Yamalo-Nenets Autonomous Okrug)
- Coordinates: 65°23′53″N 64°41′55″E
- Country: Russia
- Federal subject: Yamalo-Nenets Autonomous Okrug
- Administrative district: Shuryshkarsky District
- Founded: 1840

Population (2010 Census)
  - Total: 3,609
  - Estimate (2021): 3,736 (+3.5%)

Administrative status
  - Capital of: Shuryshkarsky District
- Time zone: UTC+5 (MSK+2)
- Postal code: 629640
- OKTMO ID: 71926412101

Muzhi (Russian: Мужи) is a rural locality (a selo) and the administrative center of Shuryshkarsky District of Yamalo-Nenets Autonomous Okrug, Russia, located on the bank of the Ob River. Population: 3,609 (2010 census); 3,200 (2002 census); 2,813 (1989 Soviet census).
