= Yekimovskaya =

Yekimovskaya Екимовская
- Village
- Location within Vologda Oblast Location within Russia
- Coordinates: 60°38′N 40°07′E
- Country: Russia
- Region: Vologda Oblast
- District: Vozhegodsky District
- Time zone: UTC+3:00

Yekimovskaya (Russian: Екимовская) is a rural locality (a village) in Yavengskoye Rural Settlement, Vozhegodsky District, Vologda Oblast, Russia. The population was 12 as of 2002.

== Geography ==
Yekimovskaya is located 22 km north of Vozhega (the district's administrative centre) by road. Senkinskaya is the nearest rural locality.
