= Podgornaya =

Podgornaya Подгорная
- Village
- Location within Arkhangelsk Oblast Location within Russia
- Coordinates: 60°57′N 43°22′E
- Country: Russia
- Region: Arkhangelsk Oblast
- District: Ustyansky District
- Time zone: UTC+3:00

Podgornaya (Russian: Подгорная) is a rural locality (a village) in Ustyansky District, Arkhangelsk Oblast, Russia. The population was 46 as of 2010.

== Geography ==
It is located on the Sodenga River.
