= Polar Urals =

Mountain range in Russia

Polar Urals Полярный Урал
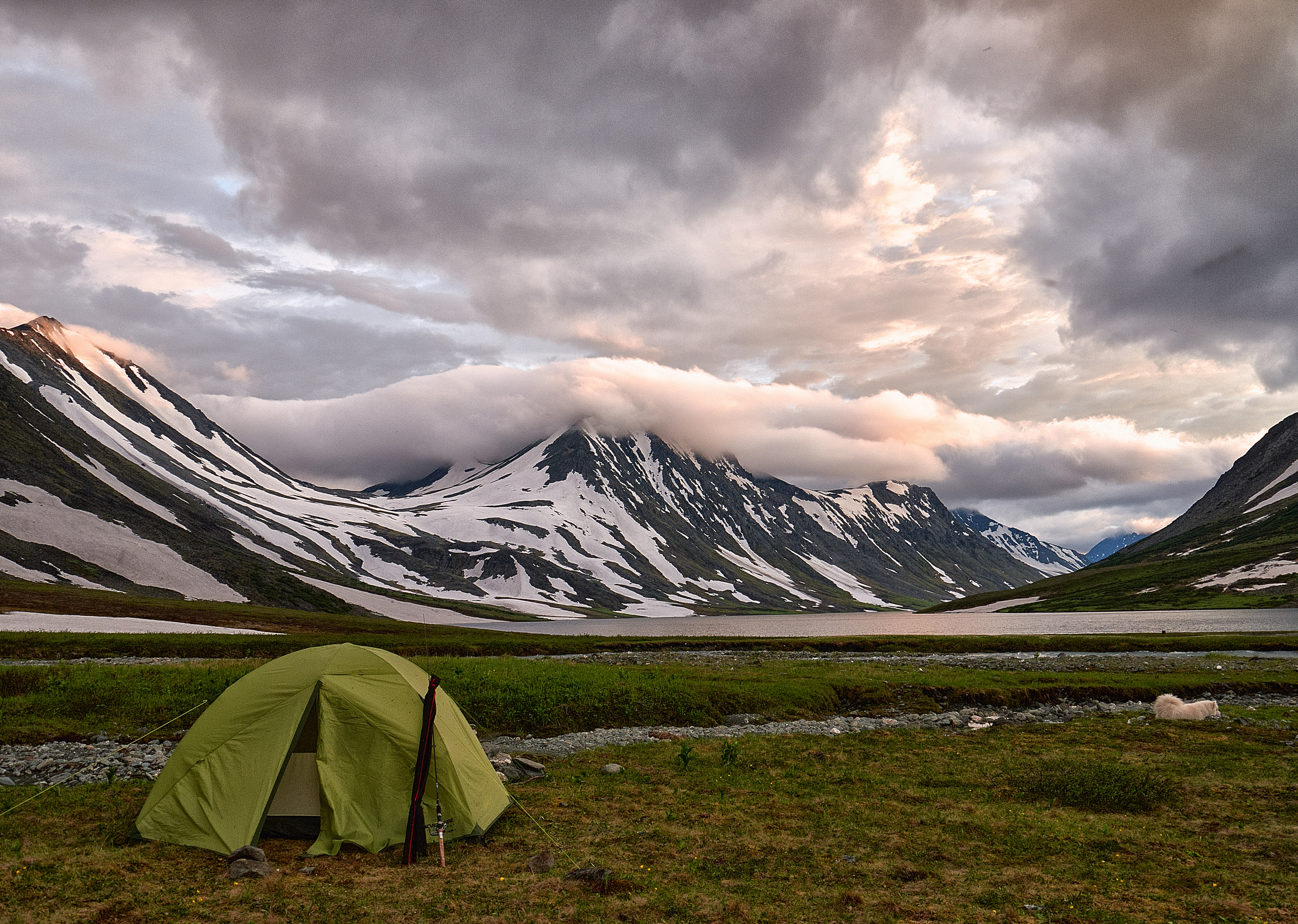
- View of the Polar Urals.

Highest point
- Peak: Mount Payer
- Elevation: 1,472 m (4,829 ft)
- Coordinates: 66°43′12″N 64°23′31″E

Dimensions
- Length: 380 km (240 mi) SW / NE
- Width: 40–100 km (25–62 mi)
- Area: 25,000 km^{2} (9,700 mi^{2})

Geography
- Location within Russia
- Country: Russia
- Federal subject: Komi Republic / Yamalo-Nenets Autonomous Okrug
- Range coordinates: 66°45′N 64°45′E
- Parent range: Ural Mountains

Geology
- Rock type(s): Quartzite, crystalline shale, volcanic and sedimentary rock

Climbing
- Easiest route: From Yeletsky, Kharp or Labytnangi

The Polar Urals (Russian: Полярный Урал, romanized: Polyarn'y Ural) are a mountain range in the western part of the Yamalo-Nenets Autonomous Okrug and the northeastern part of Komi, Russian Federation. The border between Europe and Asia runs along the main ridge of the Polar Urals. The Salekhard–Igarka Railway stretch of the Northern Railway runs along the valley of the Sob in the mountains.

== Geography ==
The Polar Urals are a subrange of the Urals. They stretch roughly from SW to NE for 380 kilometres (240 mi) forming the northern section of the long Ural chain. The range runs from the area of the sources of the Khulga river of the Ob basin in the south, to the Konstantinov Kamen mountain rising above Baydaratskaya Bay of the Kara Sea at the northern end. The predominant elevations of the ridges range between 800 metres (2,600 ft) and 1,200 metres (3,900 ft), with individual peaks rising slightly higher. The highest peak is 1,472 metres (4,829 ft) high Payer Mountain, located in the middle part.

The mountains display traces of massive ancient glaciation in U-shaped valleys, cirques and moraines. Some small glaciers remain, such as the Geographical Institute Glacier and the Dolgushin Glacier. The Usa, a tributary of the Pechora with its tributaries Elets, Kechpel, among others, the Kara, as well as numerous left tributaries of the Ob such as the Synya, Voykar, Sob, Longot-Yugan and Shchuchya, have their sources in the range. There are many lakes in the mountain area, the largest and deepest of which are Khadata-Yugan-Lor (Хадатаёганлор) and the Shchuchye (pike) lakes.

== Flora ==
The slopes in the southern parts of the Polar Urals up to a height between 300 metres (980 ft) and 400 metres (1,300 ft) are covered with sparse coniferous forests of larch and spruce with some birch. On the slopes of the higher elevations and in the northern parts there is mountain tundra with moss and lichen as well as vast rocky and stony desolate areas.

== See also ==
- List of mountains and hills of Russia
