= Life imprisonment in Russia =

Life imprisonment in Russia was introduced on December 17, 1992, by the law 4123-I. Courts could not sentence criminals to life imprisonment at that time. Only those who had been sentenced to death penalty could have their sentences commuted to life imprisonment. When the new Criminal Code of Russia was adopted in 1996, life imprisonment became a separate punishment.

== Overview ==
Article 57 part 2 of the Criminal Code of Russia forbids women, men that were below the age of 18 at the time of the offense and men that were over the age of 65 at sentencing from being sentenced to life imprisonment. If the offender was below the age of 18 at the time of the offense, the maximum sentence is 10 years' imprisonment.

Since 2002 changes have been made in Criminal Code of Russia. Multiple crimes with the same subject and direct object (simply - one article of Criminal Code) are counted as one crime for the sentence (counts separately for each offender), with these exceptions:

- Crimes committed by minors are counted as the first, but only the final result is taken into the total sentence.
- If the special object of the crime has changed or de facto never been, its counts as attempt to special subject crime in addition to the committed crime.
- If the offender neither knows nor sees the special subject, it doesn't count as a special subject crime (but it may be as "regular" crime).

Thus, multiple life sentences are concurrent.

Prisoners sentenced to life imprisonment are held in maximum security prisons (e.g. VK-240/2 White Swan (prison) in Solikamsk). After 25 years or 30 years (if a male offender is aged 65 years and over), a criminal sentenced to life imprisonment may apply to a court for "conditional early release" (условно-досрочное освобождение) if the prisoner has made no serious violations of prison rules, and has not committed a serious crime during imprisonment, but this can only be for a conviction for a single murder.

Parole, if granted, may carry restrictions, such as that the subject may not change residence, visit certain locations, and so forth. If the criminal commits a new offense, the court may retract the parole. If the application for parole is declined however, a new application can be filed 3 years later.

Life imprisonment was introduced in Russia in 1992 as a pardon at death penalty replacement. The first prisoners became eligible for parole in 2017.

== Crimes punishable with life imprisonment ==
According to the Criminal Code of Russia, as of January 8, 2026, the following crimes are punishable with life imprisonment:

- Article 105 part 2 - aggravated murder (i.e. murder of two or more persons, murder of a pregnant woman, murder committed with particular cruelty etc.)
- Articles 131 part 5 and 132 part 5 - rape or coercive sexual actions committed against a person under 18 years, if the criminal had already been sentenced for a sexual crime against a minor
- Article 134 part 6 - sexual intercourse with a person under 16 years, if the criminal had already been sentenced for a sexual crime against a minor
- Article 205 part 3 - act of terrorism committed with intrusion into nuclear energy objects; committed with radioactive materials, sources of radioactive rays, toxic or poisonous materials, dangerous chemical or biological materials; act of terrorism that caused the intended infliction of death
- Article 205.1 part 1.1 - incitement, recruitment or other involvement of a person in the commission of at least one of the crimes provided for in Article 205 (act of terrorism), Article 205.3 (undergoing training for the purpose of committing terrorism), Article 205.4 (creating a terrorist cell and participating in it), Article 205.5 (organising the activities of a terrorist organisation and participating in its activities), parts 3 and 4 of Article 206, part 4 of Article 211 (hijacking an aircraft or watercraft or a railway rolling stock, coupled with the commission of a terrorist act or other implementation of terrorist activity) of the Criminal Code of the Russian Federation, arming or training a person for the purpose of committing at least one of the specified crimes, as well as terrorism financing
- Article 205.1 part 4 - organising the commission of at least one of the crimes provided for in Article 205, Article 205.3, Parts 3 and 4 of Article 206, Part 4 of Article 211 of the Criminal Code of the Russian Federation, or directing its commission, as well as terrorism financing
- Article 205.5 part 1 - creating a terrorist organisation
- Article 206 part 4 - hostage taking that caused the intended infliction of death
- Article 210 part 4 - organising an associative criminal group committed by a person occupying the highest position in the criminal hierarchy
- Article 211 part 4 - Article 211 (hijacking an aircraft or watercraft or a railway rolling stock, coupled with the commission of a terrorist act or other terrorist activity)
- Article 228.1 part 5 - illegal producing, selling or transmittal of illegal drugs or drug-containing plants in especially large amounts
- Article 229.1 part 4 - illicit trafficking of illegal drugs or drug-containing plants or drug-producing equipment committed by an organised group or in especially big amount or with violence against a person in charge of border or customs control
- Article 275 - treason
- Article 277 - attempt on the life of a statesperson or a public figure with purpose of stopping their political activity or as an act of revenge for their activity
- Article 279 part 3 - armed rebellion resulting in death or other grave consequences
- Article 281 part 3 - sabotage that caused the intended infliction of death
- Article 281.1 part 1 - incitement, recruitment or other involvement of a person in committing sabotage, arming or training a person for the purpose of committing sabotage, as well as financing sabotage
- Article 281.1 part 2 - incitement, recruitment or other involvement of a person in committing sabotage, arming or training a person for the purpose of committing sabotage, as well as financing sabotage committed against a minor or by a person using their official position
- Article 281.1 part 4 - organising the commission of sabotage or directing its commission, as well as organising the financing of sabotage
- Article 281.2 - undergoing training for the purpose of carrying out sabotage
- Article 281.3 part 1 - creating an group that carries out sabotage
- Article 295 - infringement on life of a person related to the criminal justice system
- Article 317 - infringement on life of a law enforcement official
- Article 357 - genocide
- Article 361 part 2 - financing international terrorism, inciting, recruiting or otherwise involving a person in its commission, or arming or training a person for the purpose of committing it
- Article 361 part 3 - an act of international terrorism resulting in the death of a person

== Conditions ==
Conditions in the Russian penal systems have been criticized for their harshness, which are especially severe for those with life sentences. Life sentence prisoners are held separately from other prisoners in cells typically of two inmates each, unless one is deemed dangerous to others.

When they are being moved outside of cells to walking cages, they must remain handcuffed, and are also prohibited from lying on their beds at hours which are not their sleeping times. They are allowed to "walk" in special tiny courts one and half hours a day, which are very often just bigger rooms, the largest being seven meters by seven meters. Thus, inmates may spend years without being outside of the building and breathing fresh air.

Most of these conditions are inherited from the conditions in which death row inmates awaited execution in the last years of the Soviet Union.

== Presidential pardon ==
The president can pardon prisoners by reducing the minimum to and/or granting parole.
