= Priuralsky District =

Priuralsky District Приуральский район (Russian)
- District
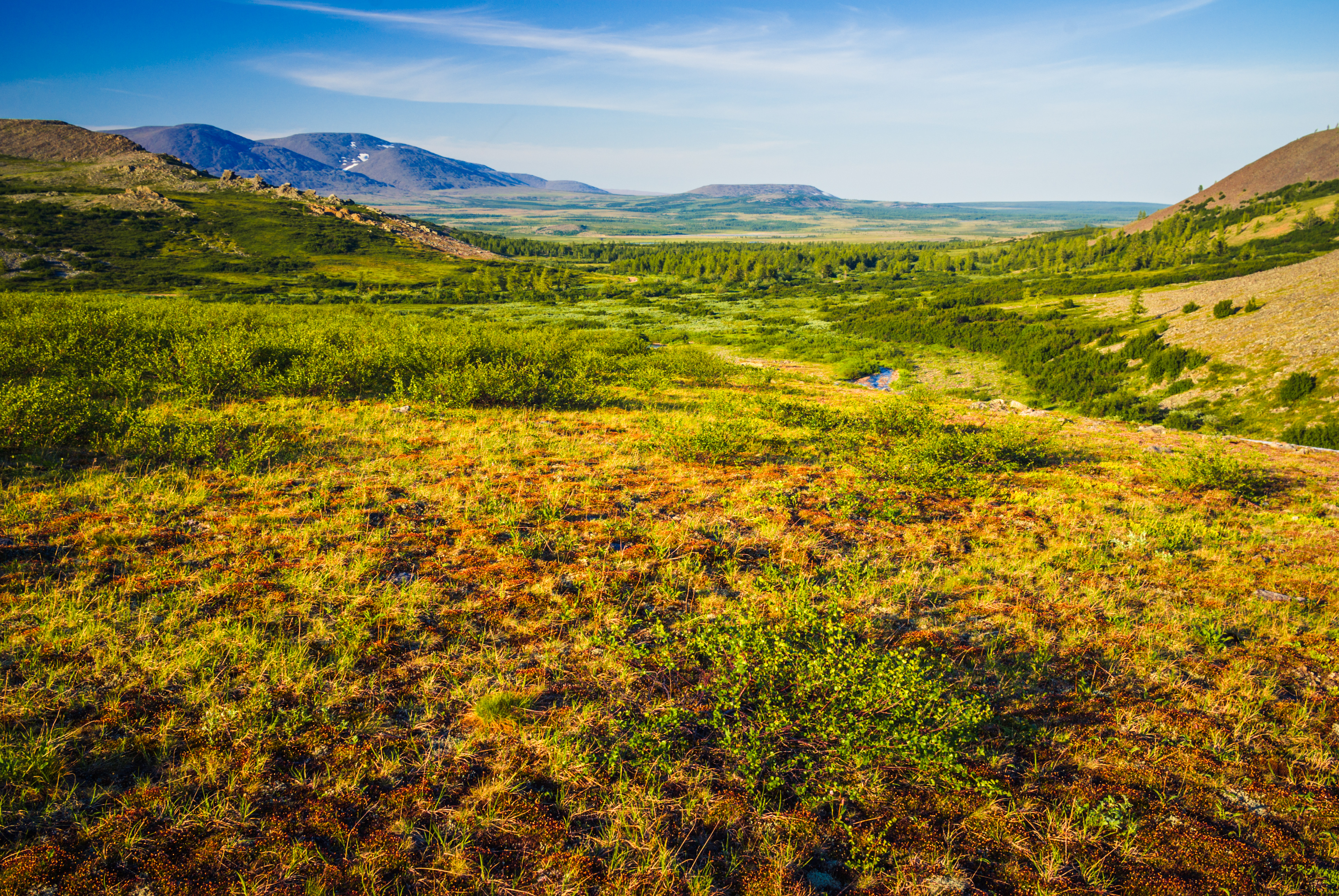
- Nature Reserve "Polar Ural", Priuralsky District

- Flag Coat of arms
- Location of Priuralsky District in Yamalo-Nenets Autonomous Okrug
- Coordinates: 66°33′32″N 67°48′13″E
- Country: Russia
- Federal subject: Yamalo-Nenets Autonomous Okrug
- Administrative center: Aksarka

Area
  - Total: 64,150 km^{2} (24,770 sq mi)

Population (2010 Census)
  - Total: 14,995
  - Density: 0.2337/km^{2} (0.6054/sq mi)
  - Urban: 42.8%
  - Rural: 57.2%

Administrative structure
  - Inhabited localities: 1 urban-type settlements, 13 rural localities

Municipal structure
  - Municipally incorporated as: Priuralsky Municipal District
  - Municipal divisions: 1 urban settlements, 3 rural settlements
- Time zone: UTC+5 (MSK+2)
- OKTMO ID: 71918000
- Website: http://www.priuralye.com/

Priuralsky District (Russian: Приура́льский райо́н; Nenets: Пэ”хэвыхы район, Pəꜧhəvyhy rajon) is an administrative and municipal district (raion), one of the seven in Yamalo-Nenets Autonomous Okrug of Tyumen Oblast, Russia. It is located in the west of the autonomous okrug. The area of the district is 64,150 square kilometers (24,770 sq mi). Its administrative center is the rural locality (a selo) of Aksarka. Population: 14,995 (2010 Census); 7,680 (2002 census); 6,616 (1989 Soviet census). The population of Aksarka accounts for 20.9% of the district's total population.

Ethnic composition (2021):

- Nenets – 38.6%
- Khanty – 27.9%
- Russians – 19.5%
- Komi – 8%
- Tatars – 1.1%
- Others – 4.9%
