= Kharp =

Urban locality with penal colonies in Russia

Kharp Харп
- Urban-type settlement
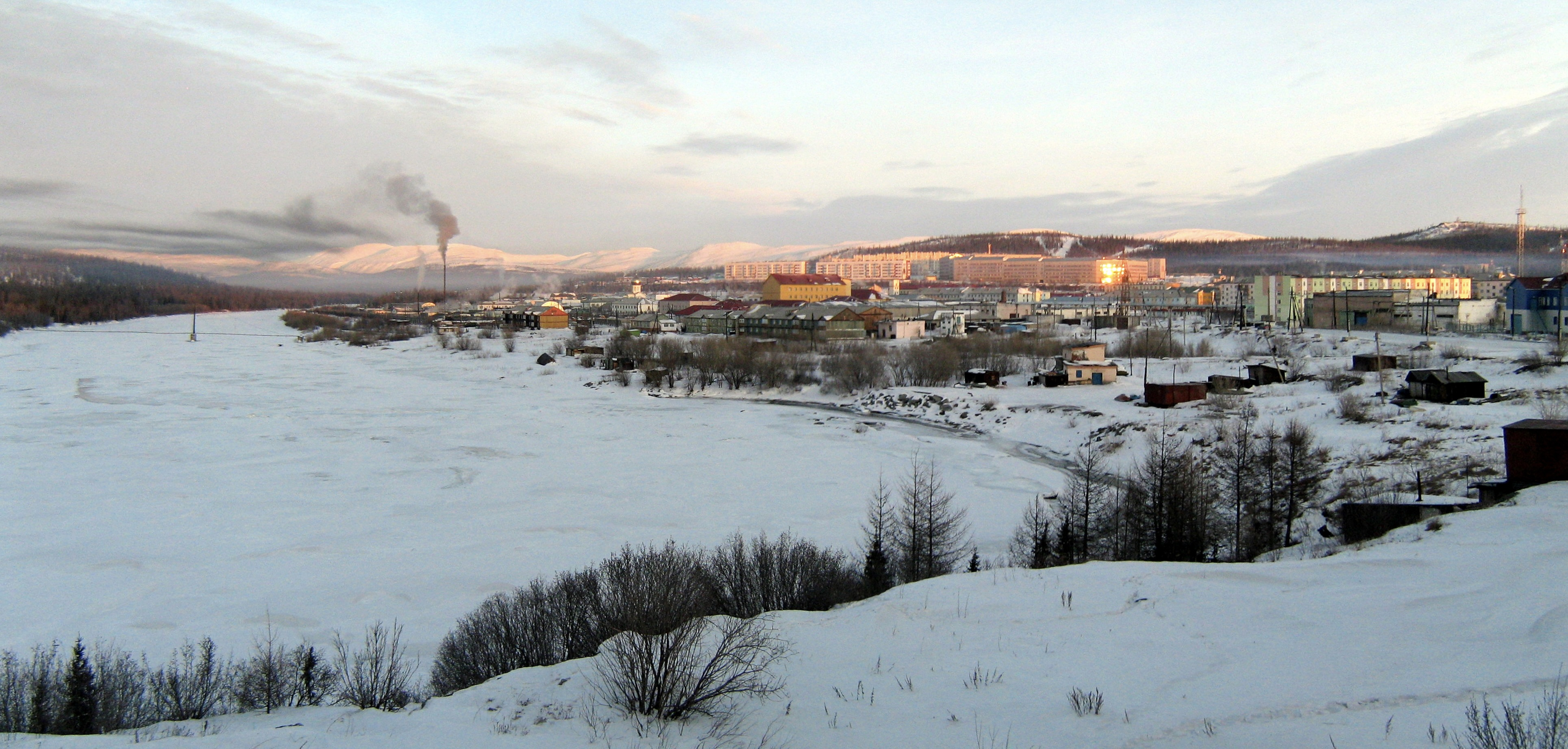
- Kharp, January 2008

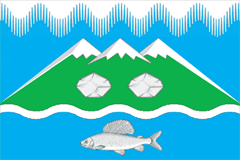
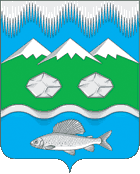
- Flag Coat of arms
- Interactive map of Kharp
- Location of Kharp Kharp (Yamalo-Nenets Autonomous Okrug)
- Coordinates: 66°48′30″N 65°48′15″E
- Country: Russia
- Federal subject: Yamalo-Nenets Autonomous Okrug

Population (2010 Census)
  - Total: 6,413
  - Estimate (2023): 4,993 (−22.1%)

Administrative status
  - Subordinated to: Priuralsky District
- Time zone: UTC+5 (MSK+2)
- Postal code: 629420
- OKTMO ID: 71953000052

Kharp (Russian: Харп; Nenets: Харп, lit. 'aurora') is an urban locality (an urban-type settlement) in the Priuralsky District of Yamalo-Nenets Autonomous Okrug, Russia, on the bank of the Sob River near the Polar Urals. Population: 6,413 (2010 census); 7,278 (2002 census); 5,381 (1989 Soviet census).

== Geography and features ==
The nearest major settlement is Salekhard, roughly 45 kilometres (28 miles) away. Kharp is the location of prison/penal colonies IK-18 Polar Owl and IK-3 Polar Wolf, two of Russia’s northernmost prisons.

== History ==
The town was built by Gulag prisoners during the Stalin era. The settlement began with the creation of the Podgornaya railway station, which consisted of several houses of railway workers. By decision of the Tyumen Regional Council of Workers' Deputies dated January 24, 1968 No. 54, the Podgornaya station was transformed into the rural village of Kharp, and in December 1971, by decision of the Supreme Soviet of the RSFSR, the Kharp Rural Council was formed. On April 9, 1981, Kharp was transferred to the administrative subordination of the city of Labytnangi (Labytnangi City Council). Kharp became a workers' village, and the village council was transformed into the Kharp village council. Since 1992, the administration of the rural settlement is Kharp.

On 16 February 2024, opposition leader Alexei Navalny died while imprisoned at Polar Wolf penal colony in Kharp.

== See also ==
- Far North (Russia)
- Salekhard–Igarka Railway

== Sources ==
- Anderson, Clare (2018). A Global History of Convicts and Penal Colonies. Google Books: Bloomsbury. p. 298. ISBN 9781350000681.
