= 78th meridian east =

Line of longitude

78th meridian east (interactive map)

The meridian 78° east of Greenwich is a line of longitude that extends from the North Pole across the Arctic Ocean, Asia, the Indian Ocean, the Southern Ocean, and Antarctica to the South Pole.

The 78th meridian east forms a great circle with the 102nd meridian west.

== From Pole to Pole ==
Starting at the North Pole and heading south to the South Pole, the 78th meridian east passes through:

Co-ordinates	Country, territory or sea	Notes
90°0′N 78°0′E	Arctic Ocean	
81°7′N 78°0′E	Kara Sea	Passing just east of Vize Island, Krasnoyarsk Krai, Russia
72°35′N 78°0′E	Russia	Yamalo-Nenets Autonomous Okrug — Oleniy Island and Gydan Peninsula
72°6′N 78°0′E	Yuratski Bay	
71°51′N 78°0′E	Russia	Yamalo-Nenets Autonomous Okrug — Gydan Peninsula
71°15′N 78°0′E	Gydan Bay	
70°56′N 78°0′E	Russia	Yamalo-Nenets Autonomous Okrug — Gydan Peninsula
68°22′N 78°0′E	Taz Estuary	
68°13′N 78°0′E	Russia	Yamalo-Nenets Autonomous Okrug — Gydan Peninsula
67°40′N 78°0′E	Taz Estuary	
67°31′N 78°0′E	Russia	Yamalo-Nenets Autonomous Okrug; Khanty-Mansi Autonomous Okrug — from 62°30′N 78°0′E; Tomsk Oblast — from 60°45′N 78°0′E; Novosibirsk Oblast — from 57°10′N 78°0′E; Altai Krai — from 53°35′N 78°0′E
53°11′N 78°0′E	Kazakhstan	Pavlodar Region East Kazakhstan Region Almaty Region passing through Lake Balkhash
42°52′N 78°0′E	Kyrgyzstan	Issyk-Kul Region passing through Issyk Kul lake
41°4′N 78°0′E	People's Republic of China	Xinjiang
35°35′N 78°0′E	Aksai Chin	Disputed between India and People's Republic of China - for about 11 km
35°29′N 78°0′E	India	Ladakh — claimed by Pakistan; Himachal Pradesh — from 32°37′N 78°0′E; Uttarakhand — from 31°10′N 78°0′E; Uttar Pradesh — from 29°34′N 78°0′E, passing through Agra; Rajasthan — from 26°55′N 78°0′E; Madhya Pradesh — from 26°42′N 78°0′E; Maharashtra — from 21°25′N 78°0′E; Telangana — from 19°18′N 78°0′E; Andhra Pradesh — from 15°52′N 78°0′E; Karnataka — from 13°52′N 78°0′E; Tamil Nadu — from 12°48′N 78°0′E, passing 8 km west of Madurai
8°20′N 78°0′E	Indian Ocean	
60°0′S 78°0′E	Southern Ocean	
69°7′S 78°0′E	Antarctica	Australian Antarctic Territory, claimed by Australia

== See also ==
- 77th meridian east
- 79th meridian east
