= 77th meridian east =

Line of longitude

77th meridian east (interactive map)

The meridian 77° east of Greenwich is a line of longitude that extends from the North Pole across the Arctic Ocean, Asia, the Indian Ocean, the Southern Ocean, and Antarctica to the South Pole.

The 77th meridian east forms a great circle with the 103rd meridian west.

It is the most populous meridian on Earth, being home to between 113.8 million and 140.0 million people as of 2019.

== From Pole to Pole ==
Starting at the North Pole and heading south to the South Pole, the 77th meridian east passes through:

Co-ordinates	Country, territory or sea	Notes
90°0′N 77°0′E	Arctic Ocean	
81°6′N 77°0′E	Kara Sea	
79°35′N 77°0′E	Russia	Krasnoyarsk Krai — Vize Island
79°29′N 77°0′E	Kara Sea	Passing just east of Vilkitsky Island, Yamalo-Nenets Autonomous Okrug, Russia; Passing just east of Neupokoyeva Island, Yamalo-Nenets Autonomous Okrug, Russia
72°22′N 77°0′E	Russia	Yamalo-Nenets Autonomous Okrug — Oleniy Island
72°13′N 77°0′E	Yuratski Bay	
72°0′N 77°0′E	Russia	Yamalo-Nenets Autonomous Okrug — Gydan Peninsula
71°24′N 77°0′E	Gydan Bay	
71°9′N 77°0′E	Russia	Yamalo-Nenets Autonomous Okrug — Gydan Peninsula
69°1′N 77°0′E	Taz Estuary	
68°37′N 77°0′E	Russia	Yamalo-Nenets Autonomous Okrug; Khanty-Mansi Autonomous Okrug — from 62°58′N 77°0′E; Tomsk Oblast — from 60°31′N 77°0′E; Novosibirsk Oblast — from 57°10′N 77°0′E
53°45′N 77°0′E	Kazakhstan	Passing through Lake Balkhash; Passing just east of Almaty
42°58′N 77°0′E	Kyrgyzstan	Passing through Issyk Kul lake
41°3′N 77°0′E	People's Republic of China	Xinjiang
35°36′N 77°0′E	Pakistan	Gilgit-Baltistan — claimed by India
34°57′N 77°0′E	India	Ladakh — from 34°09′N 77°35′E; Himachal Pradesh — from 33°0′N 77°0′E; Haryana — from 30°46′N 77°0′E; Delhi — from 28°50′N 77°0′E; Haryana — from 28°32′N 77°0′E; Rajasthan — from 27°44′N 77°0′E; Madhya Pradesh — from 26°8′N 77°0′E; Rajasthan — from 25°17′N 77°0′E; Madhya Pradesh — from 25°4′N 77°0′E; Rajasthan — from 24°43′N 77°0′E; Madhya Pradesh — from 24°29′N 77°0′E; Maharashtra — from 21°40′N 77°0′E; Karnataka — from 18°10′N 77°0′E; Andhra Pradesh — from 15°31′N 77°0′E; Karnataka — from 18°10′N 77°0′E; Andhra Pradesh — from 15°31′N 77°0′E; Karnataka — from 15°28′N 77°0′E; Andhra Pradesh — from 15°2′N 77°0′E; Karnataka — from 14°15′N 77°0′E; Andhra Pradesh — from 14°11′N 77°0′E; Karnataka — from 13°57′N 77°0′E; Andhra Pradesh — from 13°51′N 77°0′E; Karnataka — from 13°46′N 77°0′E; Tamil Nadu — from 11°47′N 77°0′E, passing through Coimbatore; Kerala — from 10°14′N 77°0′E
8°22′N 77°0′E	Indian Ocean	
60°0′S 77°0′E	Southern Ocean	
69°15′S 77°0′E	Antarctica	Australian Antarctic Territory, claimed by Australia

== See also ==
- 76th meridian east
- 78th meridian east
