= Gydan =

Gydan may refer to:

- Gydan Peninsula, a peninsula in the Kara Sea
- Gydan Bay, a bay in the Kara Sea
- Gydan Nature Reserve, the northernmost nature reserve in Western Siberia
- Gydan Mountains, an obsolete name for the Kolyma Mountains
- Yamal-Gydan tundra, an ecoregion in Northern Siberia
