= Tazovsky =

Tazovsky (masculine), Tazovskaya (feminine), or Tazovskoye (neuter) may refer to:

- Tazovsky District, a district of Yamalo-Nenets Autonomous Okrug, Russia
- Tazovsky (rural locality), a settlement in Yamalo-Nenets Autonomous Okrug, Russia
  - Tazovsky Airport (ICAO airport code: USDT) there
- Taz Estuary (Tazovskaya guba), a gulf formed by the Taz River in Yamalo-Nenets Autonomous Okrug, Russia
