= Gyda =

Gyda may refer to:

== People ==
- Gyda of Sweden (died c. 1048/1049), Swedish princess, wife of King Sweyn II of Denmark
- Gyda Christensen (1872–1964), Norwegian actress, dancer, choreographer and managing director of the Nationaltheatret ballet school
- Gyda Enger (born 1993), Norwegian ski jumper
- Gyda Gram (1851–1906), Norwegian painter
- Gyda Hansen (1938–2010), Danish film actress
- Gyda Westvold Hansen (born 2002), Norwegian Nordic combined skier
- Gyda Ellefsplass Olssen (born 1978), Norwegian sport shooter

== Places ==
- Gyda (ru:Гыда), a village in Yamalo-Nenets Autonomous Okrug, Siberia, Russia
- Gyda River, Yamalo-Nenets Autonomous Okrug
- Gyda National Park, Yamalo-Nenets Autonomous Okrug
- Gyda Peninsula, Yamalo-Nenets Autonomous Okrug
- Gyda Oil Field, a decommissioned oil field in the North Sea

== Other uses ==
- Gyda Shipping, former name of Waterfront Shipping, a Norwegian shipping company
- MF Maarfjeld, a ship known as Gyda from 1905 to 1934
