= 74th meridian east =

Line of longitude

74th meridian east

The meridian 74° east of Greenwich is a line of longitude that extends from the North Pole across the Arctic Ocean, Asia, the Indian Ocean, the Southern Ocean, and Antarctica to the South Pole.

The 74th meridian east forms a great circle with the 106th meridian west.

== From Pole to Pole ==
Starting at the North Pole and heading south to the South Pole, the 74th meridian east passes through:

Co-ordinates	Country, territory or sea	Notes
90°0′N 74°0′E	Arctic Ocean	
81°6′N 74°0′E	Kara Sea	
73°0′N 74°0′E	Gulf of Ob	Passing just west of Shokalsky Island, Russia
71°54′N 74°0′E	Russia	Gydan Peninsula, Yamalo-Nenets Autonomous Okrug
70°48′N 74°0′E	Gulf of Ob	
70°16′N 74°0′E	Russia	Gydan Peninsula, Yamalo-Nenets Autonomous Okrug
69°5′N 74°0′E	Gulf of Ob	
67°19′N 74°0′E	Russia	Yamalo-Nenetsia, Khantia-Mansia, Tyumen Oblast, Omsk Oblast
53°38′N 74°0′E	Kazakhstan	Pavlodar Region, Akmola Region, Karaganda Region (passing through Lake Balkhash), Jambyl Region
43°10′N 74°0′E	Kyrgyzstan	Chüy Region, Naryn Region, Osh Region
40°2′N 74°0′E	People's Republic of China	Xinjiang
38°32′N 74°0′E	Tajikistan	Kuhiston-Badakhshon
37°17′N 74°0′E	Afghanistan	Badakhshan Province
36°50′N 74°0′E	Pakistan	Gilgit-Baltistan - claimed by India; Khyber Pakhtunkhwa; Azad Kashmir - claimed by India
34°42′N 74°0′E	India	Jammu and Kashmir - claimed by Pakistan
34°2′N 74°0′E	Pakistan	Azad Kashmir - claimed by India
33°45′N 74°0′E	India	Jammu and Kashmir - claimed by Pakistan
33°37′N 74°0′E	Pakistan	Azad Kashmir - claimed by India; Punjab
30°30′N 74°0′E	India	Punjab; Rajasthan; Gujarat; Maharashtra; Gujarat; Maharashtra; Goa
15°1′N 74°0′E	Indian Ocean	Passing just east of Heard Island, Australia
60°0′S 74°0′E	Southern Ocean	
68°39′S 74°0′E	Antarctica	Australian Antarctic Territory, claimed by Australia

== See also ==
- 73rd meridian east
- 75th meridian east
