= Tazovsky District =

Tazovsky District Тазовский район (Russian)
- District
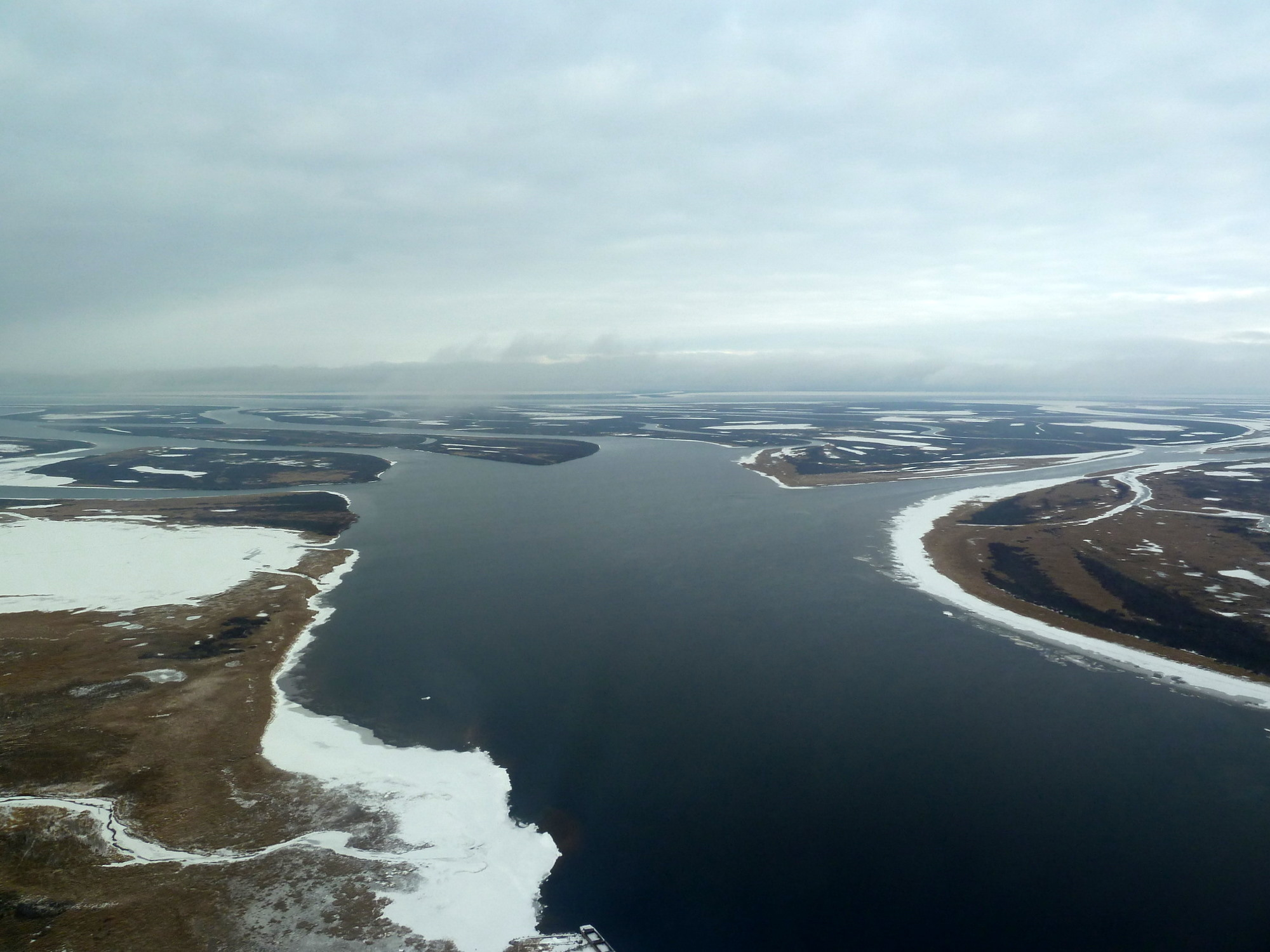
- Taz River, Tazovsky District

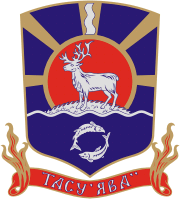
- Flag Coat of arms
- Location of Tazovsky District in Yamalo-Nenets Autonomous Okrug
- Coordinates: 67°28′40″N 78°43′02″E
- Country: Russia
- Federal subject: Yamalo-Nenets Autonomous Okrug
- Established: 10 December 1930
- Administrative center: Tazovsky

Area
  - Total: 174,343.92 km^{2} (67,314.56 sq mi)

Population (2010 Census)
  - Total: 16,537
  - Density: 0.094853/km^{2} (0.24567/sq mi)
  - Urban: 41.1%
  - Rural: 58.9%

Administrative structure
  - Inhabited localities: 9 rural localities

Municipal structure
  - Municipally incorporated as: Tazovsky Municipal District
  - Municipal divisions: 0 urban settlements, 5 rural settlements
- Time zone: UTC+5 (MSK+2)
- OKTMO ID: 71943000
- Website: http://tasu.ru/

Tazovsky District (Russian: Та́зовский райо́н; Nenets: Тасу’ Яваʼʼ, Tasuꜧ Javaꜧ) is an administrative and municipal district (raion), one of the seven in Yamalo-Nenets Autonomous Okrug of Tyumen Oblast, Russia. Its administrative center is the rural locality (a settlement) of Tazovsky.

== Geography ==
The district is located in the north, northeast, and east of the autonomous okrug and borders Purovsky, Nadymsky, and Krasnoselkupsky District; these exist to the south, south-west, and south-east, respectively - alongside Yamalsky District west over Gulf of Ob, and Taymyrsky Dolgano-Nenetsky District and Turukhansky District east within Krasnoyarsk Krai. The area of the district is 174,343.92 square kilometers (67,314.56 sq mi), which consists of the Gyda Peninsula, Taz Estuary as well as the region directly east of it.

The district is home to the Novatek Arctic LNG 2 project.

== Demographics ==
Population: 16,537 (2010 Census); 15,600 (2002 census); 18,515 (1989 Soviet census). The population of the administrative center accounts for 41.1% of the district's total population.

Historical population
Year	Pop.	±%
1939	4,939	—
1959	6,994	+41.6%
1970	9,381	+34.1%
1979	12,717	+35.6%
1989	18,515	+45.6%
2002	15,600	−15.7%
2010	16,537	+6.0%
2021	17,723	+7.2%
Source: Census data

Ethnic composition (2021):

- Nenets – 63.3%
- Russians – 24.5%
- Tatars – 2.2%
- Ukrainians – 1.9%
- Nogais – 1.3%
- Azerbaijanis – 1.2%
- Others – 5.6%

== See also ==
- Nakhodka
