= Yamal–Gydan tundra =

Ecoregion in Russia

Yamal–Gydan tundra Yamalagydanskaja tundra
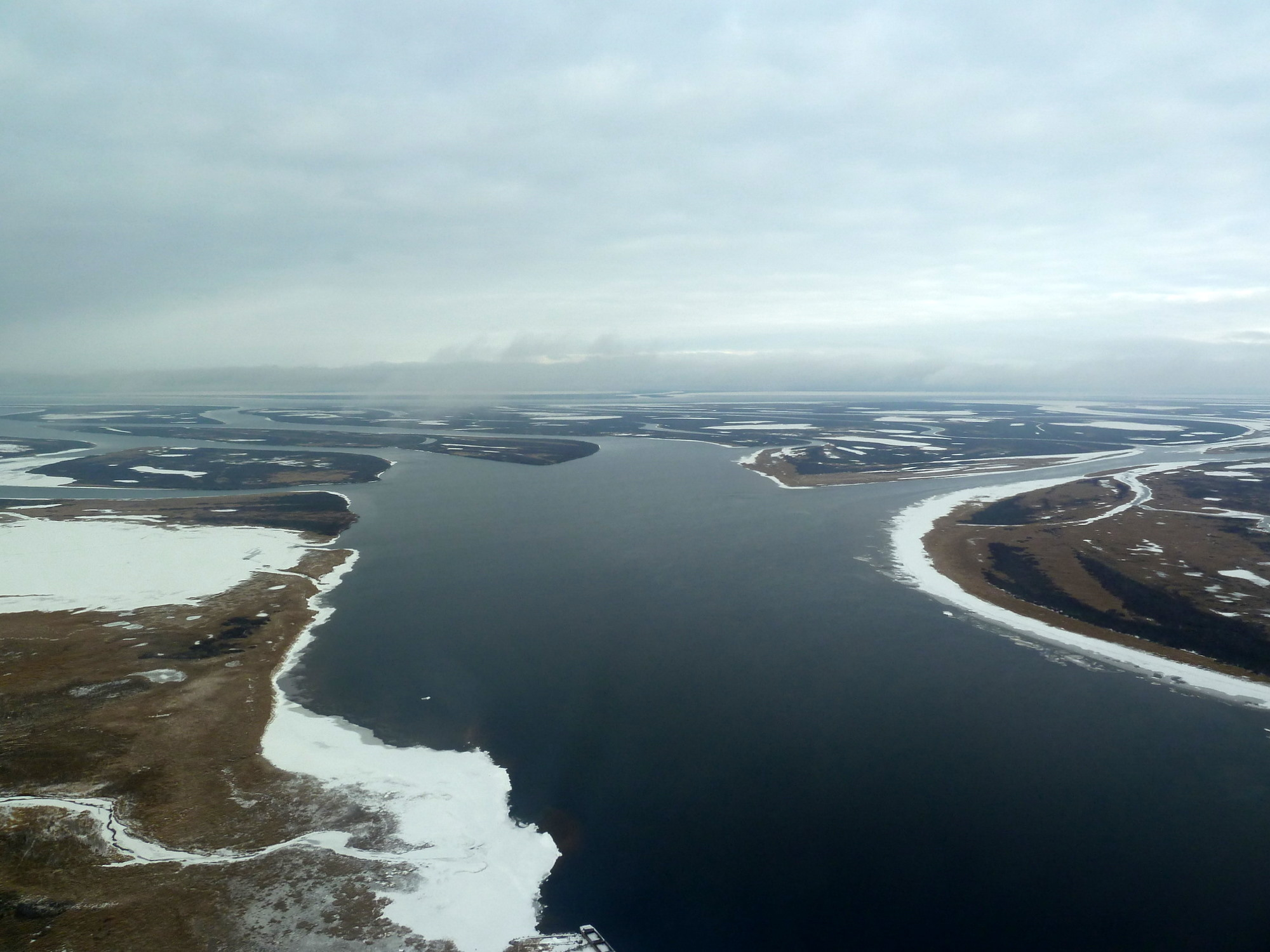
- Taz River, Yamalo-Nenets Autonomous District

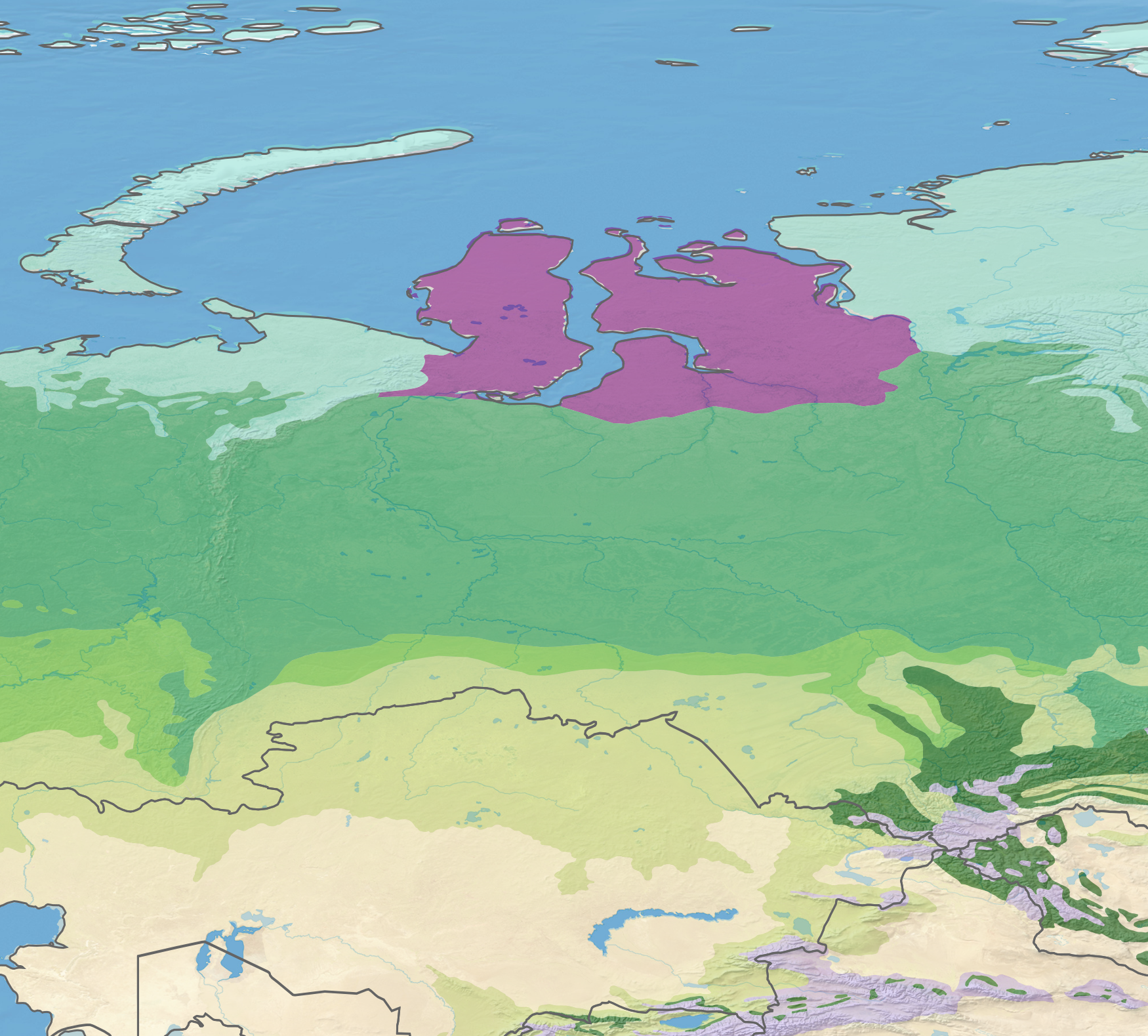
- Ecoregion territory (in purple)

Ecology
- Realm: Palearctic
- Biome: tundra

Geography
- Area: 412,067 km^{2} (159,100 sq mi)
- Country: Russia
- Coordinates: 69.25°N 76.25°E

The Yamal–Gydan tundra ecoregion (WWF ID: PA1114, also known as "Yamalagydanskaja tundra") sprawls across the expansive Yamal Peninsula and Gydan Peninsula in the northern expanse of Russia. This unique ecoregion is characterized by its sparsely populated vegetation and wildlife, yet it holds great significance as a vital haven for migratory birds and coastal sea mammals. Embraced by the Palearctic realm and firmly entrenched in the tundra biome, it boasts an extensive area, covering approximately 412,067 square kilometers (159,100 square miles).

== Location and description ==
The peninsulas lie east of the northern Ural Mountains at the ocean outlet of the Ob River delta (the Gulf of Ob), and the Yenisei River estuary. The Kara Sea is the marginal sea of the Arctic Ocean to the north, and several offshore islands are also included in the ecoregion. These islands include Bely Island. The peninsula's are flat, with extensive wetlands. The area is in the continuous permafrost zone.

== Climate ==
The climate of the Yamal-Gydan tundra ecoregion is Humid continental climate, cool summer (Köppen climate classification (Dfc)). This climate is characterised by long cold winters (at least one month averaging below 0 °C (32 °F)), and short, cool summers (one to three months greater than 10 °C (50 °F), but no month averaging above 22 °C (72 °F)). Mean precipitation is about 514 mm/year. The mean temperature at the center of the ecoregion is −24.2 °C (−11.6 °F) in January, and 10.5 °C (50.9 °F) in July.

== Flora and fauna ==
The area's floral characteristics are formed in patchworks of hummocky lichen-moss and shrub-mass areas, separated by bare ground or wetlands. The lichen tundra and bare ground is more common in the north, and in the lichen-moss communities the grass-shrub layer is thin. Marshes are heavily influenced by the strong spring floods, and the rains in the early autumn. Mammals in the area are limited to Arctic fox, lemmings, and a few small herd of reindeer. There are estimated to be 50 species of nesting birds, and the area is an important extension of the Atlantic flyway.

== Protections ==
There is one significant nationally protected area in this ecoregion: the Gydan Nature Reserve.

== See also ==
- List of ecoregions in Russia
