= 75th meridian east =

Line of longitude

75th meridian east

The meridian 75° east of Greenwich is a line of longitude that extends from the North Pole across the Arctic Ocean, Asia, the Indian Ocean, the Southern Ocean, and Antarctica to the South Pole.

The 75th meridian east forms a great circle with the 105th meridian west.

This longitude is the eastern limit of the Mauritius and Johannesburg Oceanic flight information regions, and the western limit of the Melbourne FIR.

== From Pole to Pole ==
Starting at the North Pole and heading south to the South Pole, the 75th meridian east passes through:

Co-ordinates	Country, territory or sea	Notes
90°0′N 75°0′E	Arctic Ocean	
81°6′N 75°0′E	Kara Sea	Passing just east of Shokalsky Island, Yamalo-Nenets Autonomous Okrug, Russia
72°52′N 75°0′E	Russia	Yamalo-Nenets Autonomous Okrug — Gydan Peninsula
72°33′N 75°0′E	Gulf of Ob	
72°10′N 75°0′E	Russia	Yamalo-Nenets Autonomous Okrug — Gydan Peninsula
69°7′N 75°0′E	Taz Estuary	
68°50′N 75°0′E	Russia	Yamalo-Nenets Autonomous Okrug; Khanty-Mansi Autonomous Okrug — from 63°3′N 75°0′E; Tyumen Oblast — from 58°42′N 75°0′E; Omsk Oblast — from 58°31′N 75°0′E
53°48′N 75°0′E	Kazakhstan	Passing through Lake Balkhash
42°56′N 75°0′E	Kyrgyzstan	
40°27′N 75°0′E	People's Republic of China	Xinjiang
37°31′N 75°0′E	Tajikistan	
37°17′N 75°0′E	People's Republic of China	Xinjiang
37°0′N 75°0′E	Pakistan	Gilgit-Baltistan — claimed by India; Azad Kashmir — from 34°47′N 75°0′E, claimed by India
34°39′N 75°0′E	India	Jammu and Kashmir
32°28′N 75°0′E	Pakistan	Punjab
32°2′N 75°0′E	India	Punjab; Haryana— from 29°52′N 75°0′E; Rajasthan — from 29°17′N 75°0′E; Madhya Pradesh — from 24°53′N 75°0′E; Maharashtra — from 21°35′N 75°0′E; Karnataka — from 16°57′N 75°0′E; Kerala — from 12°47′N 75°0′E; Karnataka — from 12°45′N 75°0′E; Kerala — from 12°44′N 75°0′E
12°27′N 75°0′E	Indian Ocean	
60°0′S 75°0′E	Southern Ocean	
69°3′S 75°0′E	Antarctica	Australian Antarctic Territory, claimed by Australia

== See also ==
- 74th meridian east
- 76th meridian east
