= Tanama (river) =

River in Krasnoyarsk Krai, Russia

Tanama Танама
- Mouth location in Krasnoyarsk Krai, Russia

Location
- Country: Yamalo-Nenets Autonomous Okrug, Tyumen Oblast; Krasnoyarsk Krai, Russia

Physical characteristics
- Source
  - location: Gyda Peninsula
  - coordinates: 69°14′8″N 81°21′10″E
  - elevation: 61 m (200 ft)
- Mouth: Yenisey
  - coordinates: 70°27′22″N 82°8′36″E
  - elevation: 0.5 m (1 ft 8 in)
- Length: 521 km (324 mi)
- Basin size: 23,100 km^{2} (8,900 sq mi)

Basin features
- Progression: Yenisey→ Kara Sea

The Tanama (Russian: Танама) is a river in northern Siberia, Russia. It is one of the main tributaries of the Yenisey.

The Tanama is 521 kilometres (324 mi) long, and the area of its basin is 23,100 square kilometres (8,900 mi^{2}). The river has the highest water level in July and the lowest during the winter. It flows through desolate, uninhabited areas and there are no permanent settlements along its course.

== Course ==
The Tanama has its source in the Gyda Peninsula, Yamalo-Nenets Autonomous Okrug, Tyumen Oblast. It flows first roughly northwestwards and northwards, forming a wide arch across the tundra above the Arctic Circle. In its upper and middle course the river forms the border of the Tyumen Oblast for about 430 km (270 mi). The Tanama changes direction in its lower course and meanders roughly eastwards, flowing across the swampy lowlands of the northeastern part of the West Siberian Plain. About 40 kilometres (25 mi) before the mouth the river splits into many branches and finally joins the western (left) bank of the left channel of the Yenisey (Deryabinsky Yenisey) near Polikarpovsk village, not far from the Yenisey Gulf and about 200 km (120 mi) northwest of Dudinka. The river freezes in mid-September and stays frozen until late May or early June.

The Tanama has 30 tributaries that are over 15 km (9.3 mi) long. The main tributaries are six of these that are over 100 km (62 mi) in length: the Ngarka-Lybonkatyakha, Yartoyakha, Nenereyakha, Payotayakha on the left and the Big Pyakoyakha and Yara on the right.

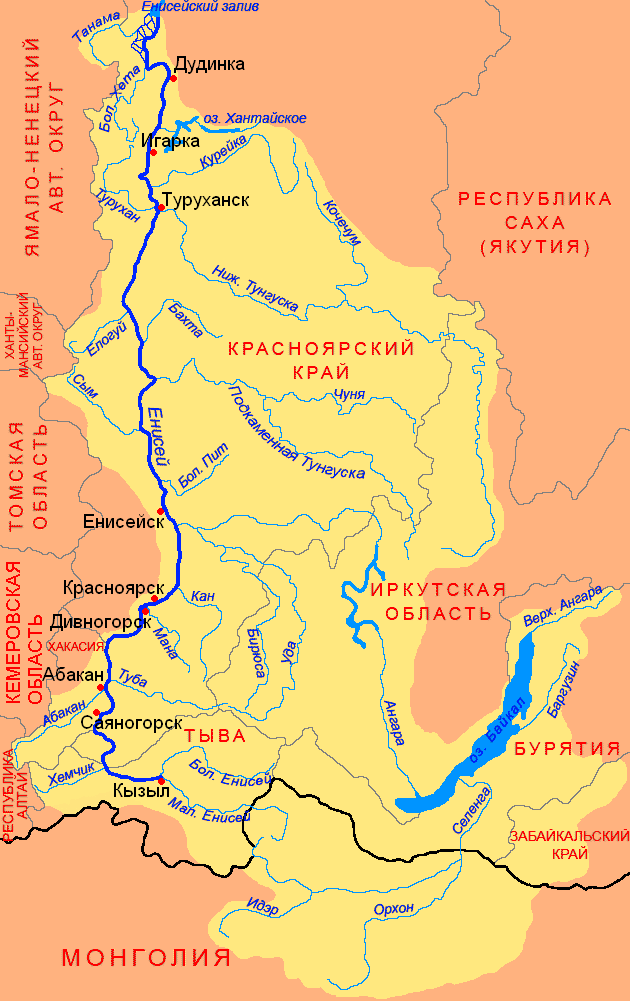
Basin of the Yenisei with the Tanama in the upper left corner.

== See also ==
- List of rivers of Russia
