= 77th meridian =

77th meridian may refer to:

- 77th meridian east, a line of longitude east of the Greenwich Meridian
- 77th meridian west, a line of longitude west of the Greenwich Meridian

77th meridian west	77th meridian east
