= Arctic LNG 1 =

Project in the Gydan Peninsula, Russia

Arctic LNG1 is a project initiated in 2014 by Russian firm Novatek, designed to produce natural gas from its source in the Gyda Peninsula to be liquefied by the project's LNG terminal for onward shipment, or storage by its floating storage unit.

== History ==
In April 2020 Novatek was planning for its Arctic LNG1 project to come on stream in the latter half of the decade.

On 28 April 2020 Novatek registered a claim in the Bukharinskiy License Area (BLA), which it intended to add to the Arctic LNG1 project.

On 24 March 2021 Novatek won the North-Gydanskiy License Area (NGLA), which it intended to add to the Arctic LNG1 project.

As of May 2021 Novatek had yet to make a final investment decision on the Arctic LNG1 project.

On 5 July 2021 CEO Mark Gyetvay told reporters that the Soletsko-Khanavaiskoye gas field, the Geofizicheskoye gas field and the Trekhbugornoye gas field, which would all be part of the Arctic LNG1 project, would contribute an expected 19.8mn metric tons/year of LNG to his bottom line.

In December 2022 Novatek announced a new gas field discovery, which would contribute to the Arctic LNG1 project. Gennady Timchenko named it for the company's former CEO Vitkor Girya.

In January 2023 Novatek claimed for its claim in the BLA an estimated recoverable reserves of 52 Bcm of natural gas, which it planned to add to its Arctic LNG1 project.

In June 2023 Novatek received shipment of a floating storage unit that it intended for the Arctic LNG1 project, amongst others.

In March 2024 experts said that obstacles remained for Arctic LNG1 "including the need to confirm a sufficient resource base and recoverable reserves to underpin [the] project."

In June 2024 it was reported that Novatek claims that its Arctic LNG1 has proven reserves of 2,237 million boe, proven and probable reserves (PRMS) of 4,236 million boe. On the 14th of the same month, the US OFAC added to its sanctions about the Arctic LNG1 project.

== See also ==
- Arctic LNG 2
- Yamal LNG
