= Ob Bay (disambiguation) =

Ob Bay may refer to:

- Gulf of Ob in Russian Arctics
- Ob' Bay in Antarctics
