= Vankor Field =

Siberian oil and gas field

Vankor field
- Location within Russia
- Country: Russia
- Region: Krasnoyarsk Krai
- Offshore/onshore: onshore
- Coordinates: 67°45′19″N 83°27′41″E
- Operator: Vankorneft
- Partner: Rosneft, ONGC Videsh Ltd, Oil India Ltd, Indian Oil Corporation Ltd, and Bharat PetroResources Ltd

Field history
- Discovery: 1988
- Start of production: 11 Aug 2009

Production
- Estimated oil in place: 1,500 million barrels (~2.0×10^{8} t)
- Estimated gas in place: 3,178×10^{9} cu ft (90.0×10^{9} m^{3})

The Vankor Field (Ванкорское нефтегазовое месторождение) is an oil and gas field in Russia, located 130 kilometres (81 mi) west of Igarka in the Turukhansk District of Krasnoyarsk Krai in Eastern Siberia, close to the border with Yamalo-Nenets Autonomous Okrug. Its estimated reserves are 520 million metric tons of oil and 95 billion cubic meters of natural gas. Production was launched in August, 2009. The field is operated by Russian national oil company Rosneft through its subsidiary Vankorneft.

== History ==
The Vankor Field was discovered in 1988. After the dissolution of the Soviet Union the development license for Vankor was issued to Eniseineft and the development license for Vankor North was issued to Taimyrneft, both controlled by the Anglo-Siberian Oil Company. Yukos managed to take control of part of Vankor through a complicated financial scheme, but did not manage to start production. In 2001, London-based Sibir Energy made a takeover bid to the Anglo-Siberian Oil Company to gain access to Vankor field. The bid was rejected. In 2002, TotalFinaElf wanted to buy 52% of the Vankor field development project, but the deal was not closed because of legal difficulties. In 2003, the Anglo-Siberian Oil Company was acquired by Rosneft as the result of a public bid on the London Stock Exchange, and the deal with Total was canceled. Currently, the field is being developed and operated by Rosneft's subsidiary CJSC Vankorneft. On 9 November 2014 the China National Petroleum Corporation purchased a 10-percent stake in ZAO Vankorneft.

The field was officially launched on 21 August 2009. Russian Prime Minister Vladimir Putin attended the launch. Putin said the oil produced at Vankor will be fed to pipelines under construction to China and the Baltic Sea.

== Reserves ==
The Vankor field has oil reserves 3,800 million barrels (600×10^{6} m^{3}), of which 1,500 million barrels (240×10^{6} m^{3}) are proved reserves, and 95 billion cubic meters of natural gas. The estimated production capacity is 510 thousand barrels per day (81×10^{3} m^{3}/d). Rosneft expected to produce 3 million metric tons (60 thousand barrels per day (9.5×10^{3} m^{3}/d)) of oil at Vankor in 2009 and 11 million metric tons (220 thousand barrels per day (35×10^{3} m^{3}/d)) in 2010. By August 2014 the production was 442,000 barrels per day.

== Facilities ==
The front-end engineering and design of the oil field facilities was done by SNC-Lavalin. The project comprises 1,685 infrastructure facilities, including an oil treatment line, a 210-megawatt gas turbine power station, and a tank farm with capacity of 140,000 cubic meters of crude oil.

== Transmission ==
Oil from the field is transported through the Rosneft-owned Vankor–Purpe pipeline to the Transneft-owned trunk pipeline's tie-in point in the village of Purpe in the Yamal-Nenets Autonomous District, where it will be fed to Transneft's transmission network. The Vankor–Purpe pipeline is 556 kilometres (345 mi) long and it has a capacity 600 thousand barrels per day (95×10^{3} m^{3}/d). It was built by Purneftegaz, a subsidiary of Rosneft. From there, it is planned that most of the oil will be fed to the Eastern Siberia–Pacific Ocean oil pipeline as also supply Rosneft's westward export, including through the BPS-2 pipeline.

Natural gas would be transported to the nearby-located Lukoil's infrastructure and further to the Gazprom transportation system.

== Effects on the economy ==
Vankor is one of Rosneft's most important projects, and one of the largest industrial projects in Russia. The field is important for the development of the oil and gas industry and Russia's economy at large. According to Rosneft, more than 80% of equipment bought for the project was made in Russia. The Vankor project employs more than 450 contractors and sub-contractors and 12,000 construction workers and 2,000 vehicles were employed at the peak of construction work. Overall tax payments during the project lifetime will amount to 4.5 trillion roubles at an oil price of US$60 per barrel.

== See also ==
- Petroleum industry in Russia
