= Messoyakha =

Physical characteristics
- Source
  - elevation: 46.2 m (152 ft)
- Mouth: Kara Sea
  - location: Taz Estuary
  - coordinates: 67.7147°N 77.6685°E
- Length: 466 km (290 mi)
- Basin size: 26,000 km^{2} (10,000 sq mi)
- Discharge
  - average: 230 m^{3}/s (8,100 cu ft/s)

The Messoyakha (Russian: Мессояха) is a river in Yamalo-Nenets Autonomous Okrug, Russia. It drains into the Taz Estuary. It is 466 kilometres (290 mi) long, and has a drainage basin of 26,000 square kilometres (10,000 sq mi).
