= 76th meridian east =

Line of longitude

76th meridian east (interactive map)

The meridian 76° east of Greenwich is a line of longitude that extends from the North Pole across the Arctic Ocean, Asia, the Indian Ocean, the Southern Ocean, and Antarctica to the South Pole.

The 76th meridian east forms a great circle with the 104th meridian west.

== From Pole to Pole ==
Starting at the North Pole and heading south to the South Pole, the 76th meridian east passes through:

Co-ordinates	Country, territory or sea	Notes
90°0′N 76°0′E	Arctic Ocean	
81°6′N 76°0′E	Kara Sea	Passing just west of Vize Island, Krasnoyarsk Krai, Russia
73°31′N 76°0′E	Russia	Yamalo-Nenets Autonomous Okrug — Vilkitsky Island
73°30′N 76°0′E	Kara Sea	Passing just west of Neupokoyev Island, Yamalo-Nenets Autonomous Okrug, Russia
71°53′N 76°0′E	Russia	Yamalo-Nenets Autonomous Okrug — Gydan Peninsula
71°52′N 76°0′E	Gydan Bay	
71°11′N 76°0′E	Russia	Yamalo-Nenets Autonomous Okrug — Gydan Peninsula
69°15′N 76°0′E	Taz Estuary	
68°58′N 76°0′E	Russia	Yamalo-Nenets Autonomous Okrug; Khanty-Mansi Autonomous Okrug — from 63°4′N 76°0′E; Tomsk Oblast — from 59°23′N 76°0′E; Omsk Oblast — from 57°21′N 76°0′E; Novosibirsk Oblast — from 56°33′N 76°0′E; Omsk Oblast — from 56°27′N 76°0′E; Novosibirsk Oblast — from 56°9′N 76°0′E
54°13′N 76°0′E	Kazakhstan	Passing through Lake Balkhash
42°56′N 76°0′E	Kyrgyzstan	
40°23′N 76°0′E	China	Xinjiang — passing through the city of Kashgar
36°28′N 76°0′E	Pakistan	Gilgit-Baltistan — for about 11 km, claimed by India
36°22′N 76°0′E	China	Xinjiang — for about 8 km
36°17′N 76°0′E	Pakistan	Gilgit-Baltistan — for about 14 km, claimed by India
36°10′N 76°0′E	China	Xinjiang — for about 16 km
36°1′N 76°0′E	Pakistan	Gilgit-Baltistan — claimed by India
34°38′N 76°0′E	India	Ladakh — claimed by Pakistan; Jammu and Kashmir — from 34°0′N 76°0′E, claimed by Pakistan; Himachal Pradesh — from 32°56′N 76°0′E; Punjab — from 31°40′N 76°0′E; Haryana — from 29°45′N 76°0′E; Rajasthan — from 28°17′N 76°0′E; Haryana — from 28°9′N 76°0′E; Rajasthan — from 28°4′N 76°0′E; Haryana — from 28°2′N 76°0′E; Rajasthan — from 27°52′N 76°0′E; Madhya Pradesh — from 24°2′N 76°0′E; Maharashtra — from 21°22′N 76°0′E; Karnataka — from 17°20′N 76°0′E; Kerala — from 11°56′N 76°0′E
10°36′N 76°0′E	Indian Ocean	
60°0′S 76°0′E	Southern Ocean	
69°33′S 76°0′E	Antarctica	Australian Antarctic Territory, claimed by Australia

== See also ==
- 75th meridian east
- 77th meridian east
