= 79th meridian east =

Line of longitude

79th meridian east

The meridian 79° east of Greenwich is a line of longitude that extends from the North Pole across the Arctic Ocean, Asia, the Indian Ocean, the Southern Ocean, and Antarctica to the South Pole. The 79th meridian east forms a great circle with the 101st meridian west.

== From Pole to Pole ==
Starting at the North Pole and heading south to the South Pole, the 79th meridian east passes through:

Co-ordinates	Country, territory or sea	Notes
90°0′N 79°0′E	Arctic Ocean	
81°7′N 79°0′E	Kara Sea	Passing just west of Ushakov Island, Krasnoyarsk Krai, Russia; Passing just west of Uyedineniya Island, Krasnoyarsk Krai, Russia
73°15′N 79°0′E	Russia	Krasnoyarsk Krai — Nosok Island
73°14′N 79°0′E	Kara Sea	
73°1′N 79°0′E	Russia	Krasnoyarsk Krai — Sibiryakov Island
72°44′N 79°0′E	Kara Sea	Yenisei Gulf
72°22′N 79°0′E	Russia	Yamalo-Nenets Autonomous Okrug; Krasnoyarsk Krai — from 69°53′N 79°0′E; Yamalo-Nenets Autonomous Okrug — from 69°50′N 79°0′E; Khanty-Mansi Autonomous Okrug — from 62°36′N 79°0′E; Tomsk Oblast — from 60°48′N 79°0′E; Novosibirsk Oblast — from 57°2′N 79°0′E; Altai Krai — from 53°40′N 79°0′E
52°7′N 79°0′E	Kazakhstan	Passing through Lake Balkhash
42°47′N 79°0′E	Kyrgyzstan	
41°39′N 79°0′E	People's Republic of China	Xinjiang
35°55′N 79°0′E	Aksai Chin	Disputed between India and People's Republic of China
34°1′N 79°0′E	People's Republic of China	Tibet
33°48′N 79°0′E	Aksai Chin	Disputed between India and People's Republic of China
33°36′N 79°0′E	People's Republic of China	Tibet
33°20′N 79°0′E	India	Ladakh
32°22′N 79°0′E	People's Republic of China	Tibet
31°20′N 79°0′E	Aksai Chin	Disputed between India and People's Republic of China
31°3′N 79°0′E	India	Uttarakhand; Uttar Pradesh — from 29°7′N 79°0′E; Madhya Pradesh — from 26°35′N 79°0′E; Uttar Pradesh — from 26°12′N 79°0′E; Madhya Pradesh — from 25°17′N 79°0′E; Maharashtra — from 21°36′N 79°0′E, passing 9km west of Nagpur; Telangana — from 19°33′N 79°0′E; Andhra Pradesh — from 16°14′N 79°0′E; Tamil Nadu — from 13°5′N 79°0′E; Andhra Pradesh — from 13°3′N 79°0′E; Tamil Nadu — from 13°2′N 79°0′E
9°42′N 79°0′E	Indian Ocean	Palk Strait
9°21′N 79°0′E	India	Tamil Nadu
9°16′N 79°0′E	Indian Ocean	
60°0′S 79°0′E	Southern Ocean	
68°17′S 79°0′E	Antarctica	Australian Antarctic Territory, claimed by Australia

== See also ==
- 78th meridian east
- 80th meridian east
