= Yuratski Bay =

Bay in Russia

- Юрацкая губа (Russian)
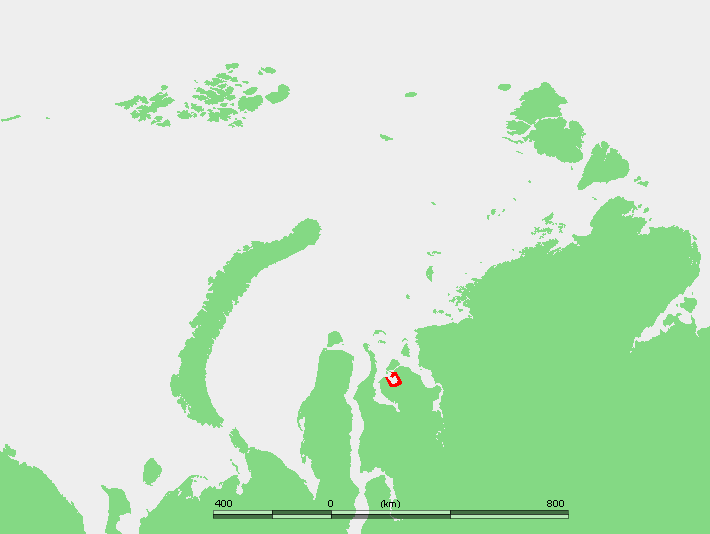
- Map showing the location of the Yuratski Bay.

- Location within Russia
- Location: Kara Sea
- Coordinates: 72°00′N 78°00′E
- River sources: Yunyakha River, Yesyayakha River
- Basin countries: Russia
- Settlements: Matyuysale

The Yuratski Bay (Russian: Юрацкая губа; Yuratskaya Guba) is an inlet on the Siberian coast in the Kara Sea. It is located in the Gyda Peninsula and it is roughly 45 km long and 30 km wide at its widest point. Lat 71° 50’ N, long 77° 45’ E.

== Geography ==
This round and regular-shaped bay lies east of the Gydan Bay, between the large estuaries of the Ob (Gulf of Ob) and the Yenisei River. Off the northern end of the Oleni Peninsula limiting the bay on the east lies Oleni Island. The peninsula formed between this bay and neighboring Gydan Bay is known as the Mamonta Peninsula (Poluostrov Mamonta).

The Yuratski Bay is surrounded by low tundra coast and there are numerous river mouths on its shores, the main ones being the Yunyakha and the Yesyayakha. Winters are long and harsh in this area, so that the waters in the inlet remain frozen for at least nine months every year.

The settlement of Matyuysale lies along the coast off the northeastern end of its mouth.

This Bay is located in the Yamal-Nenets autonomous district administrative region of the Russian Federation.

The area of the bay is part of the Great Arctic State Nature Reserve, the largest nature reserve of Russia.
