= Nakhodka (disambiguation) =

Nakhodka is a seaport city in Primorsky Krai, Russia.

Nakhodka may also refer to:

- Nakhodka Bay, the bay on which the city stands
- Nakhodka, Yamalo-Nenets Autonomous Okrug, a village in Yamalo-Nenets Autonomous Okrug, Russia
