= Kashmir Valley =

Valley in Indian-administered Jammu and Kashmir

Kashmir valley
- Vale of Kashmir
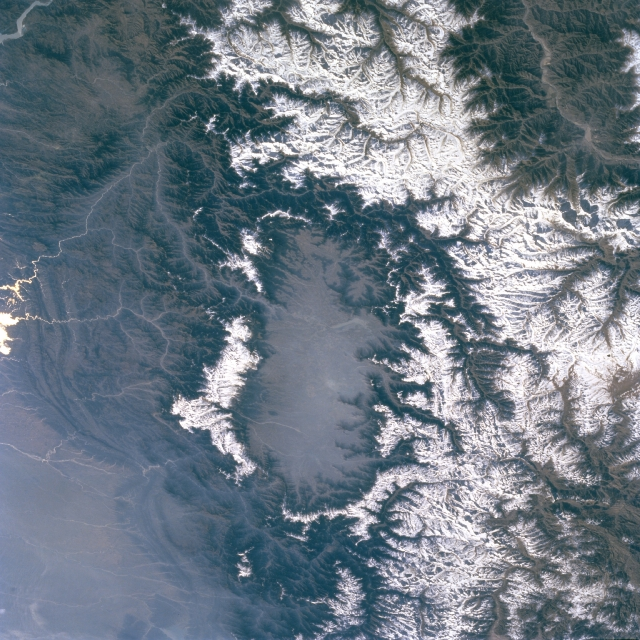
- Satellite imagery of the Kashmir Valley, showcasing the snow-capped peaks of the Pir Panjal Range (left in image; southwest in compass) and the Great Himalayas (right in image; northeast in compass) flanking it on either side

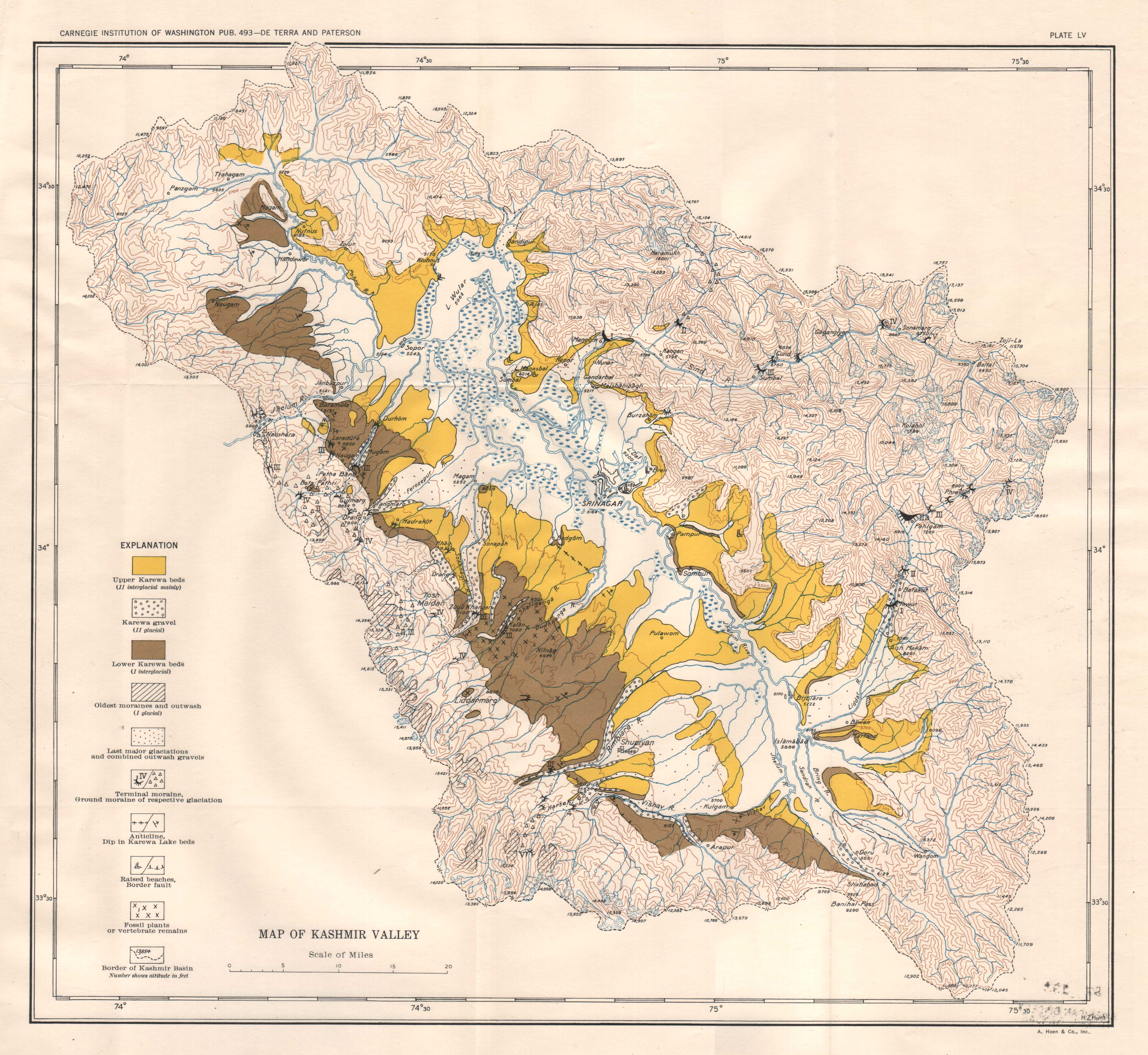
- A 1938 geological map of the Kashmir Valley
- Length: 83 mi (134 km) Northwest-Southeast
- Width: 20 mi (32 km)
- Area: 15,520.3 km^{2} (5,992.4 mi^{2})

Geography
- Location: South Asia
- Country: Administered by India in the disputed Kashmir region
- State: Union territory of Jammu and Kashmir
- Coordinates: 34.05°N 74.80°E
- River: Jhelum

The Kashmir Valley, also known as the Vale of Kashmir, is an intermontane valley or basin in the northern part of Indian-administered Jammu and Kashmir. The valley is surrounded by the ranges of the Himalayas, bounded on the southwest by the lower Himalayan Pir Panjal Range and on the northeast by the Greater Himalayan Range. It is approximately 135 km (84 mi) long and 32 km (20 mi) wide, and drained by the Jhelum River. It falls entirely within the Kashmir Division of Jammu and Kashmir.

== Geography ==
The Kashmir Valley lies between latitude 33° and 35°N, and longitude 73° and 76°E. The valley is 100 km (62 mi) wide and covers 15,520.3 km^{2} (5,992.4 sq mi) in area. It is bounded by sub-ranges of the Western Himalayas: the Great Himalayas bound it in the northeast and separate it from the Tibetan Plateau, whereas the Pir Panjal Range in the Lesser Himalayas bounds it on the west and the south, and separates it from the Punjab Plain. The valley has an average elevation of 1,850 metres (6,070 ft) above sea-level, but the surrounding Pir Panjal range has an average elevation of 10,000 feet (3,000 m). The Jhelum River is the major river which acts a drainage for whole Kashmir Valley, before exiting the Kashmir Valley through Uri gorge the Jhelum River falls into Wular Lake second largest freshwater lake in Asia. Before entering Wular Lake Srinagar city and Sonawari lies on its banks and after leaving Wular Lake Sopore and Baramulla towns lies on its banks. It originates at Verinag; and then fed by a large number of glacier fed rivers and streams Lidder, Sind and Doodh Ganga rivers are its major tributaries. Unlike other areas of Kashmir region, the Kashmir Valley is densely populated owing to the availability of a large expanse of fertile flat land. The valley floor is in the Western Himalayan broadleaf forest ecoregion.

== Climate ==
The Kashmir Valley has a moderate climate, which is largely defined by its geographic location, with the towering Karakoram Range in the north, Pir Panjal Range in the south and west, and Zanskar Range in the east. It can be generally described as cool in the spring and autumn, mild in the summer and cold in the winter. As a large valley with significant differences in geo-location among various districts, the weather is often cooler in the hilly areas compared to the flat lower parts.

Summer is usually mild and fairly dry, but relative humidity is generally high and the nights are cool. Precipitation occurs throughout the year, mainly from western disturbance and monsoon, and no month is particularly dry. The hottest month is July (mean minimum temperature 16 °C, mean maximum temperature 32 °C) and the coldest are December–January (mean minimum temperature −15 °C, mean maximum temperature 0 °C).

The Kashmir Valley enjoys a moderate climate but weather conditions are unpredictable. The record high temperature is 37.8 °C and the record low is −18 °C. On 5 and 6 January 2012, after years of relatively little snow, a wave of heavy snow and low temperatures (winter storm) shocked the valley covering it in a thick layer of snow and ice.

The Valley has seen an increase in relative humidity and annual precipitation in the last few years. This is most likely because of the commercial afforestation projects which also include expanding parks and green cover.

Srinagar

Climate chart (precipitation, max. and min. temperature)
J	F	M	A	M	J	J	A	S	O	N	D
48 7 −2	68 8 −1	121 14 3	85 21 8	68 25 11	39 30 15	62 30 18	76 30 18	28 27 12	33 22 6	28 15 1	54 8 −2
- █ Average max. and min. temperatures in °C
- █ Precipitation totals in mm
- Source: HKO
Imperial conversion
J	F	M	A	M	J	J	A	S	O	N	D
1.9 45 28	2.7 47 31	4.8 57 38	3.3 69 46	2.7 76 51	1.5 85 59	2.4 86 65	3 85 64	1.1 81 54	1.3 72 42	1.1 59 34	2.1 47 29
- █ Average max. and min. temperatures in °F
- █ Precipitation totals in inches

== See also ==
- Kashmir Division, the administrative division of India covering the Kashmir Valley.
