= Yuribey =

Yuribey (Russian: Юрибей) may refer to the following places in Russia:

- Yuribey (Baydaratskaya Bay), river flowing into Baydaratskaya Bay
- Yuribey (Gydan Bay), river flowing into Gydan Bay
- Yiribey, Yamalo-Nenets Autonomous Okrug, village in Russia
