= 80th meridian =

80th meridian may refer to:

- 80th meridian east, a line of longitude east of the Greenwich Meridian
- 80th meridian west, a line of longitude west of the Greenwich Meridian

80th meridian west	80th meridian east
