= Vyngypur =

River in Russia

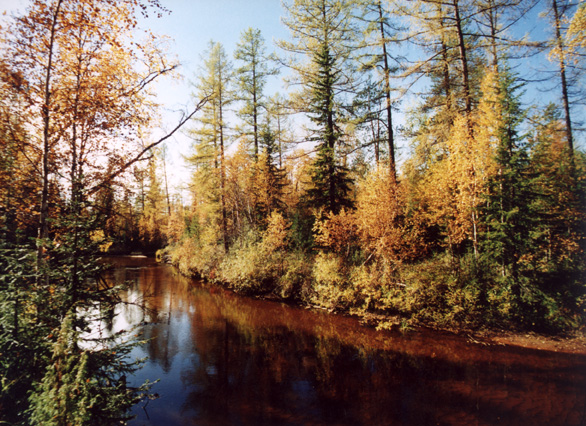

Physical characteristics
- Source
  - location: Siberian Uvaly
- Mouth: Pyakupur
  - coordinates: 64°24′13″N 76°47′33″E
- Length: 319 km (198 mi)(main stream)
- Basin size: 8,710 km^{2} (3,360 sq mi)
- Discharge
  - average: 85 m^{3}/s (3,000 cu ft/s)

Basin features
- Progression: Pyakupur→ Pur→ Kara Sea

The Vyngypur (Russian: Вынгыпур, also: Вынгапур, Вэнга-Пур, Вэнгапур) is a river in Yamalo-Nenets Autonomous Okrug, Russia, a right tributary of the Pyakupur. It is 319 kilometres (198 mi) long, and has a drainage basin of 8,710 square kilometres (3,360 sq mi). It starts on the northern slope of the Siberian Uvaly Hills, about 60 km east of Noyabrsk, and flows north through a boggy terrain. The river has more than 300 tributaries along its way, most of them short, but more than 60 of them exceed 10 km in length. Two main tributaries are Apakapur (left) and Vyngyyakha (right).

Melting snow provides the key water source for the river. High water period usually begins in May, sometimes at the end of April, and is finished by the second half of June-first days of July.
