= 79th meridian =

79th meridian may refer to:

- 79th meridian east, a line of longitude east of the Greenwich Meridian
- 79th meridian west, a line of longitude west of the Greenwich Meridian

79th meridian west	79th meridian east
