= 75th meridian =

75th meridian may refer to:

- 75th meridian east, a line of longitude east of the Greenwich Meridian
- 75th meridian west, a line of longitude west of the Greenwich Meridian

75th meridian west	75th meridian east
