= 74th meridian =

74th meridian may refer to:

- 74th meridian east, a line of longitude east of the Greenwich Meridian
- 74th meridian west, a line of longitude west of the Greenwich Meridian

74th meridian west	74th meridian east
