= Gyda River =

River in Yamalo-Nenets Autonomous Okrug, Russia

Gyda
- Mouth of the Gyda River

Location
- Country: Russia

Physical characteristics
- Source: Lake Hosato
  - coordinates: 71°00′35″N 79°58′53″E
- Mouth: Gydan Bay
  - coordinates: 70°55′34″N 78°23′53″E
- Length: 147 km (91 mi)
- Basin size: 6820 km²

Basin features
- Tributaries
  - left: Nyavuyakha, Neyyakha, Hydentoyakha, Adaseyakha;
  - right: Lumpadayakha

Gyda river is a river in Russia. It flows through the territory of the Tazovsky district of the Yamalo-Nenets Autonomous Okrug. The length of the river is 147 km, the area of its drainage basin is 6820 km^{2}. It takes its name from the Nenets that lives near the river.

== Geography ==
The river originates from Lake Hosato (Haseinto), flows from east to west, and empties into the southeastern part of Gydan Bay into the Kara Sea. The average annual water consumption is 45 to 50 m³ / s, the annual runoff volume is 1.4 to 1.5 cubic kilometers.

The river freezes in late September, early October, opens in the second half of June. The duration of freezing is more than 8.5 months. The river feeds mainly on snow, the presence of permafrost explains the low proportion of groundwater. The high tide begins in June and ends in August. Runoff is regulated by lakes.

Main tributaries: on the left - Nyavuyakha, Neyyakha, Hydentoyakha, Adaseyakha; on the right - Lumpadayakha.
