= Pyakupur =

Pyakupur Пякупур
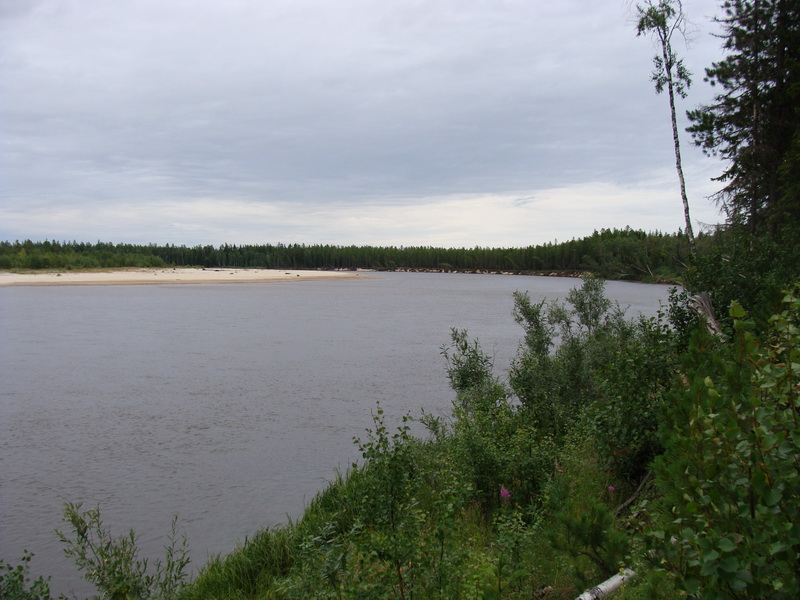

- Mouth location in Yamalo-Nenets Autonomous Okrug, Russia

Location
- Country: Russia
- Region: Yamalia

Physical characteristics
- Source: Siberian Uvaly
  - location: near Muravlenko, Yamalia
  - coordinates: 63°12′11″N 73°54′18″E
  - elevation: 111 m (364 ft)
- Mouth: Pur
  - location: near Tarko-Sale, Yamalia
  - coordinates: 64°56′50″N 77°48′50″E
  - elevation: 16 m (52 ft)
- Length: 542 km (337 mi)
- Basin size: 31,400 km^{2} (12,100 sq mi)
- Discharge
  - average: 290 m^{3}/s (10,000 cu ft/s)

Basin features
- Progression: Pur→ Kara Sea

The Pyakupur (Russian: Пякупур) is a river in Yamalo-Nenets Autonomous Okrug, Russia, the left source river of the Pur. The length of the Pyakupur is 542 km. The area of its basin is 31,400 km^{2}. There are approximately 32,600 lakes in the river basin. The main tributaries: Vyngypur (right) and Purpe (left). The river's peak month of discharge is June. The average discharge of water 290 m^{3}/s.

== See also ==
- List of rivers of Russia
