= Pur (Russia) =

River in the Yamalo-Nenets Autonomous Okrug in Russia

Pur Пур
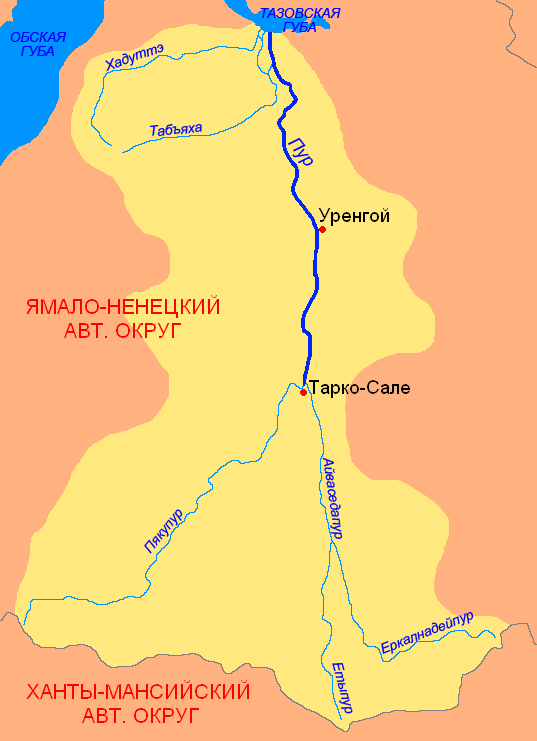

- Mouth location in Yamalo-Nenets Autonomous Okrug, Russia

Location
- Country: Russia
- Federal subject: Yamalia

Physical characteristics
- Source: Pyakupur
  - location: near Muravlenko, Yamalia
  - coordinates: 63°12′11″N 73°54′18″E
  - elevation: 111 m (364 ft)
- 2nd source: Ayvasedapur
  - location: near Raduzhny, Khanty-Mansia
  - coordinates: 63°03′29″N 80°32′13″E
  - elevation: 140 m (460 ft)
- Source confluence
  - location: near Tarko-Sale, Yamalia
  - coordinates: 64°56′50″N 77°48′50″E
  - elevation: 16 m (52 ft)
- Mouth: Taz Estuary, Kara Sea
  - location: near Nakhodka, Yamalia
  - coordinates: 67.554°N 77.8838°E
  - elevation: 5 m (16 ft)
- Length: 389 km (242 mi)
- Basin size: 112,000 km^{2} (43,000 sq mi)

The Pur (Russian: Пур) is a river in the Yamalo-Nenets Autonomous Okrug, Russia. t has a length of 389 kilometres (242 mi) —1,024 kilometres (636 mi) counting the length of the Pyakupur at its head. The area of its basin is 112,000 square kilometres (43,000 mi^{2}).

The Urengoy gas field and Gubkin gas and oil field are located in the basin of the Pur.

== Course ==
The Pur is formed at the confluence of the Pyakupur and Ayvasedapur rivers, which have their sources in the northern slopes of the Siberian Uvaly. It flows roughly northwards across the northern West Siberian Plain, meandering strongly. In its lower course its channel divided into branches. Purovsky District is named after the river. Just a few miles west of the mouth of the Taz, the Pur flows into the Taz Estuary, which is connected through the Gulf of Ob with the Kara Sea. The river freezes up in November and stays icebound until May.

== See also ==
- List of rivers of Russia
