= Gyda National Park =

National park in Yamalo-Nenets Autonomous Okrug, Russia

- Russian: Национальный парк «Гыданский»
- IUCN category II (national park)
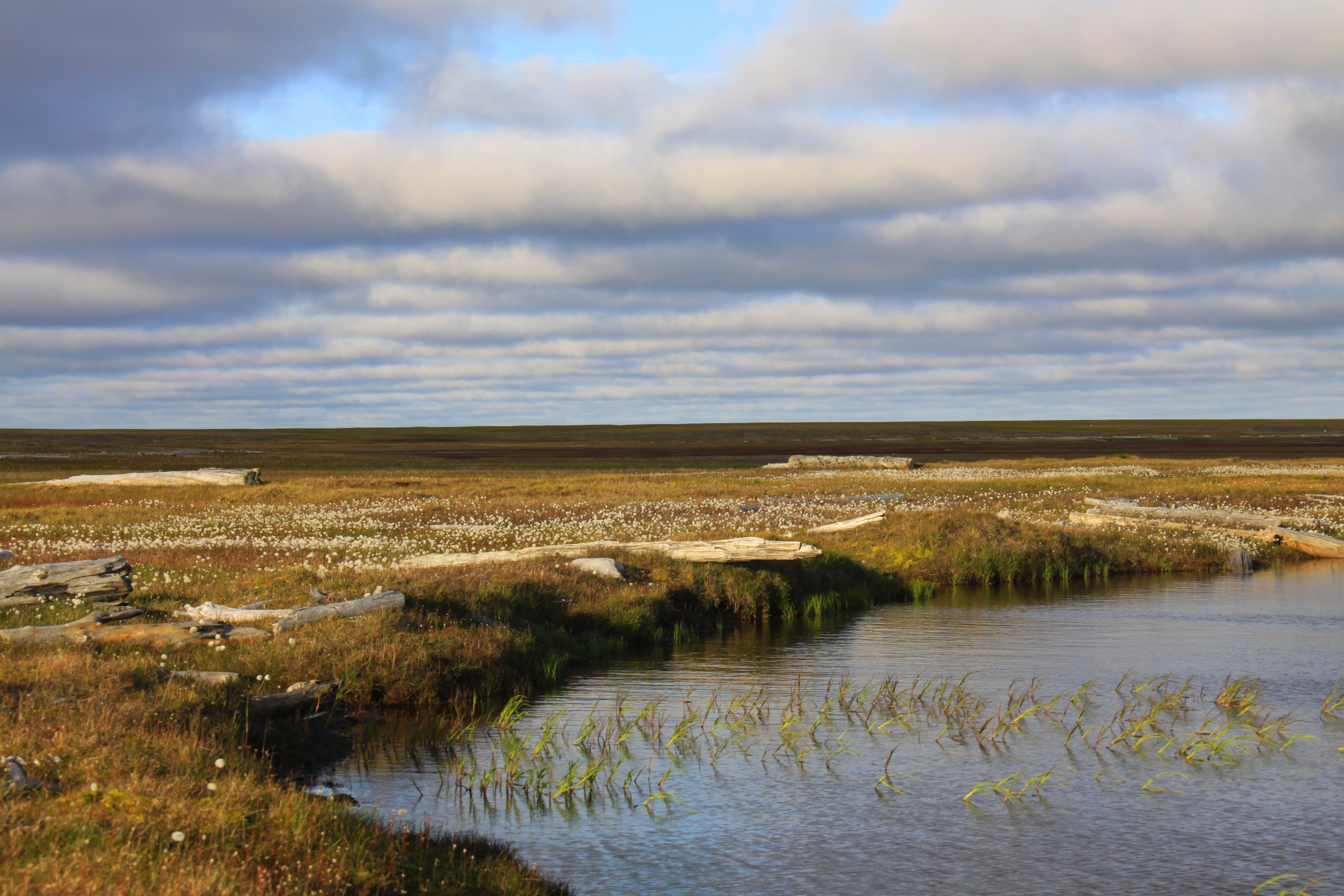
- Shokalsky Island

- Location within Russia
- Location: Yamalo-Nenets Autonomous Okrug
- Nearest city: Village of Taz
- Coordinates: 71°50′35″N 78°12′23″E
- Area: 878,174 hectares (2,170,015 acres; 3,391 sq mi)
- Established: 1996
- Governing body: Ministry of Natural Resources and Environment (Russia)
- Website: http://gdanskiyzp.ru/

Gyda National Park (Gydansky National Park; Russian: Национальный парк «Гыданский») is the northernmost national park in the Western Siberia. The park covers arctic terrain of the Gyda Peninsula and nearby islands in the Kara Sea. It is situated in the Tazovsky District of Yamalo-Nenets Autonomous Okrug. Until 2019, it was a 'zapovednik' (strict nature reserve).

== Topography ==
The terrain is a flat plain that covers the northern tip of Gyda Peninsula, which marks the right side of the Ob River delta, where the river enters the Kara Sea. It also includes the Yapay Peninsula (to the west), the northern part of the Mammoth peninsula, Deer Island, Shokalsky Island, Pestsovoye Island and others. The protected area encompasses 878.2 thousand ha, of which about one sixth (159,800 ha) is on islands. There is also a 150,000 ha buffer zone.

== Climate and ecoregion ==
Gyda is located in the Yamal-Gyda tundra ecoregion. It covers the Yamal and Gyda peninsulas in north-central Russia, the Ob River estuary, and into the Kara Sea and associated islands. It includes boggy tundra of sedge and heather, wetlands of the Ob estuary, and arctic desert of the far north.

The climate of Gyda is cold semi-arid (Köppen climate classification (ET) ). This is a local climate in which at least one month has an average temperature high enough to melt snow (0 °C (32 °F)), but no month with an average temperature in excess of 10 °C (50 °F). The average annual temperature is -10 C degrees. The area is frost-free for 55 to 70 days per year. Snow cover lasts about 240 days, from October to June .

== Flora and fauna ==
The terrain is arctic tundra and covered with permafrost. Seasonal thawing does not exceed 0.8-1.2 meters. The plant life, where the ground is not bare, is mostly moss and lichen-shrub-moss hummocky tundra. There is some tundra in the southern sectors, with wetlands and sedge marshes. Shrubs include polar willow (Salix polaris)) and dwarf birch. On the southern border there are some larch trees. Scientists on the reserve have recorded 180 species of vascular plants.

Scientists at the reserve have recorded 18 species of mammals (including reindeer, fox, Siberian lemmings). Polar bear, walruses and narwhal (which as recently become rare) are found on the site, and the calving population of reindeer within the boundaries are considered genetically different from the similar Taimyr reindeer. Reindeer herds can reach several thousand, with wolves following. Scientists have recorded 76 species of birds (40 of which are nesting), and 20 species of vertebrate fish. Birds include the Sea eagle, Tundra swan, and the near-threatened Yellow-billed loon.

== Ecoeducation and access ==
As a strict nature reserve, the Gyda Reserve was closed to the general public, although scientists and those with 'environmental education' purposes could make arrangements with park management for visits. There are no roads, access is difficult, and there are no facilities. The main office is in the Village of Taz. Because the area is in an area with oil and gas reserves, it is the subject of pressure for potential development energy resources.
