= UTC+05:00 =

Identifier for a time offset from UTC of +5:00

- Time zone
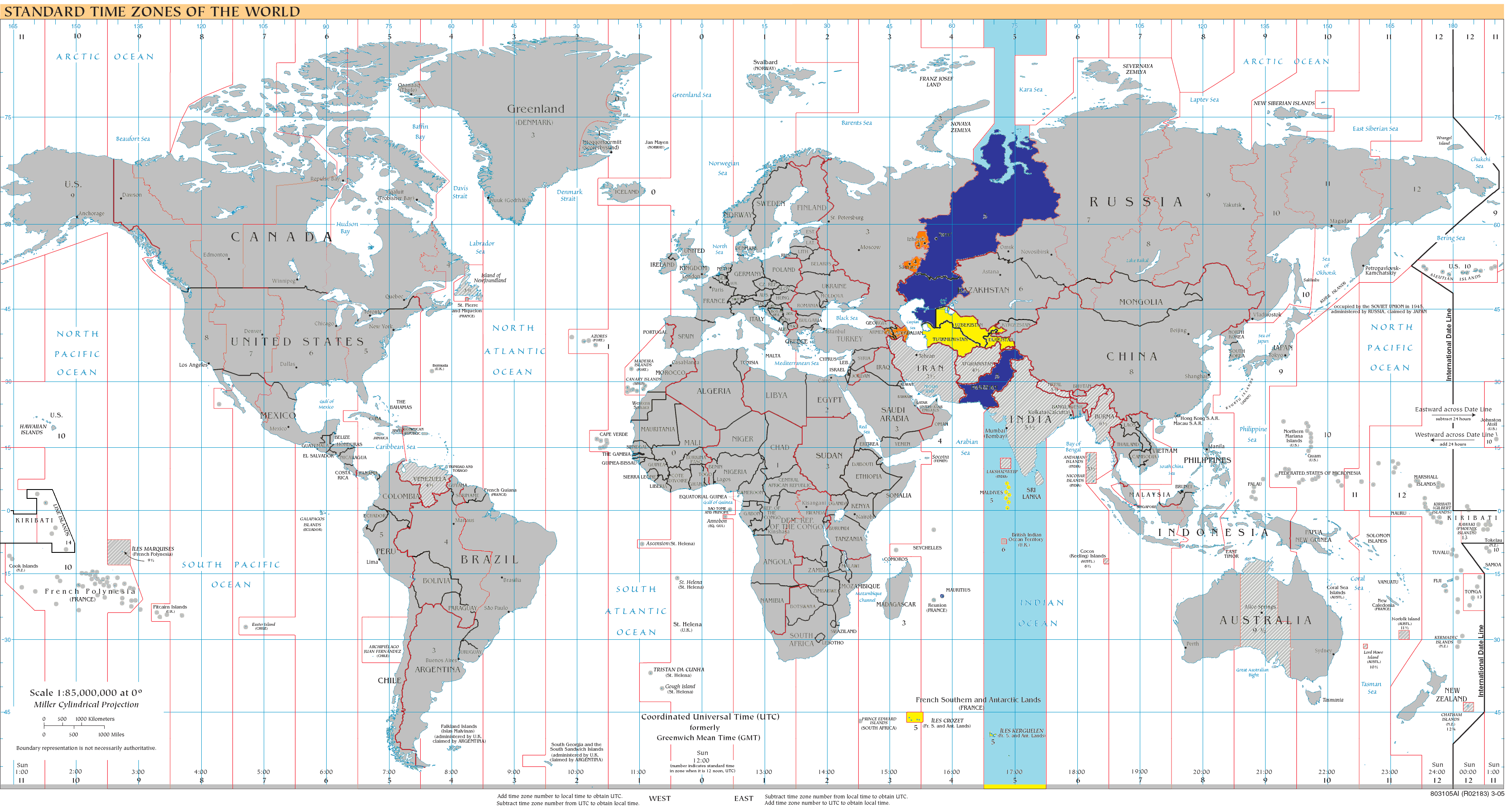
- World map with the time zone highlighted

UTC offset
- UTC: UTC+05:00

Current time
- 10:21, 11 July 2026 UTC+05:00 [refresh]

Central meridian
- 75 degrees E

Date-time group
- E

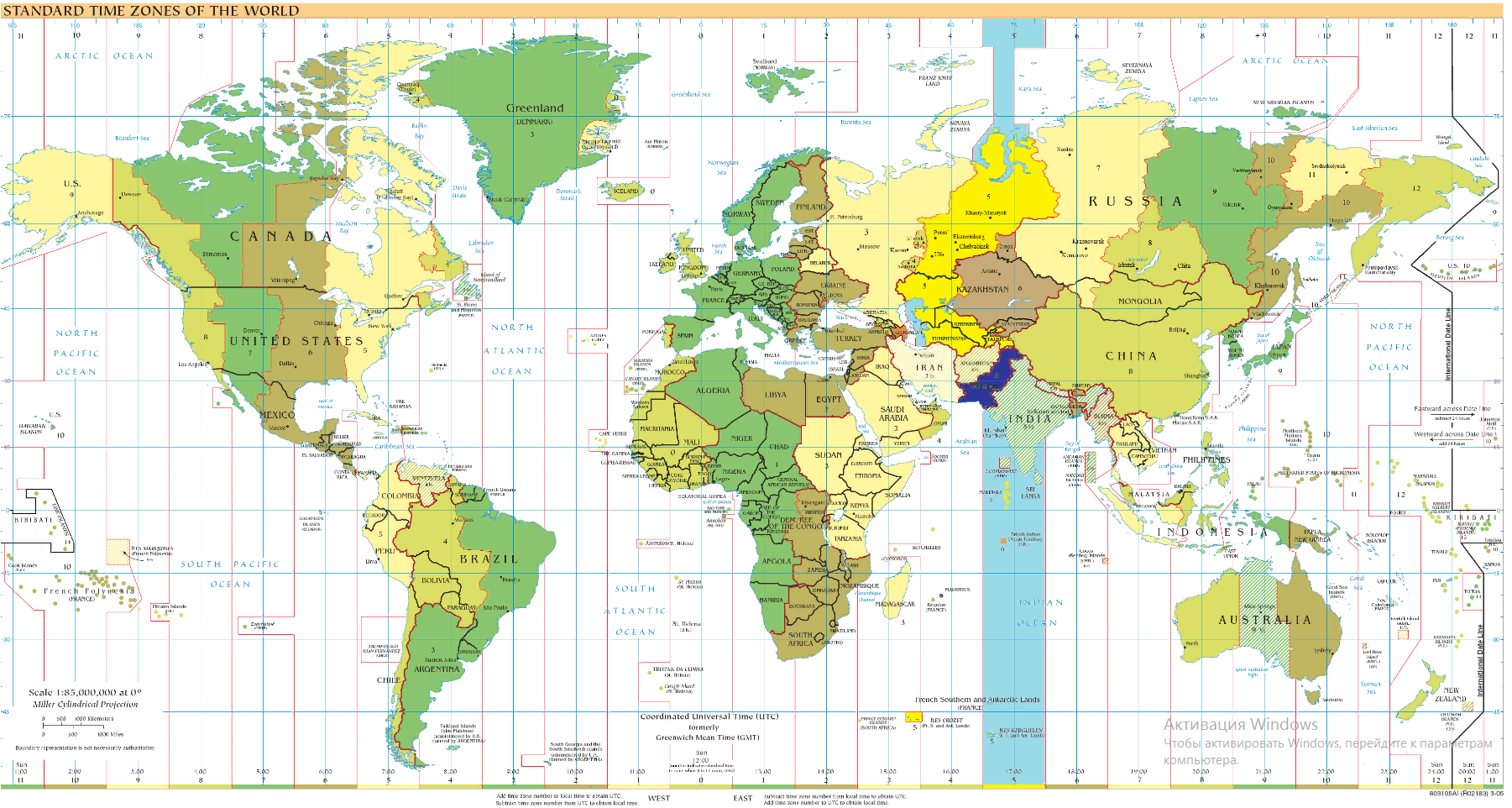
UTC+05:00 2010: blue, yellow (year-round), light blue (sea areas)

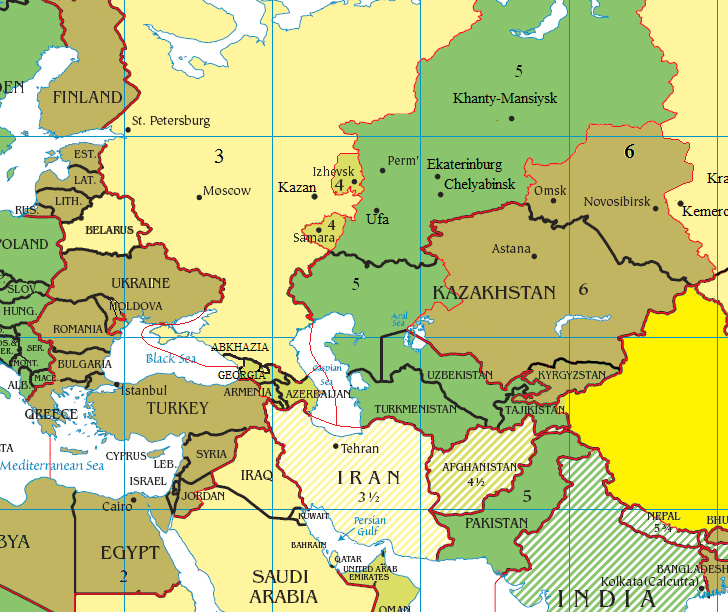
Time zones of central Eurasia (numbers are hours ahead of UTC)

Time in Europe: Light Blue / Western European Time / Greenwich Mean Time (UTC); Blue / Western European Time / Greenwich Mean Time (UTC); Blue / Western European Summer Time / British Summer Time / Irish Standard Time (UTC+1); Red / Central European Time (UTC+1); Red / Central European Summer Time (UTC+2); Yellow / Eastern European Time / Kaliningrad Time (UTC+2); Ochre / Eastern European Time (UTC+2); Ochre / Eastern European Summer Time (UTC+3); Green / Moscow Time / Türkiye Time (UTC+3); Turquoise / Armenia Time / Azerbaijan Time / Georgia Time / Samara Time (UTC+4); Pink / Kazakhstan Time / Yekaterinburg Time (UTC+5); ▉▉▉▉ Pale hues: Standard time observed all year ▉▉▉ Dark hues: Daylight saving time

Time in Kazakhstan
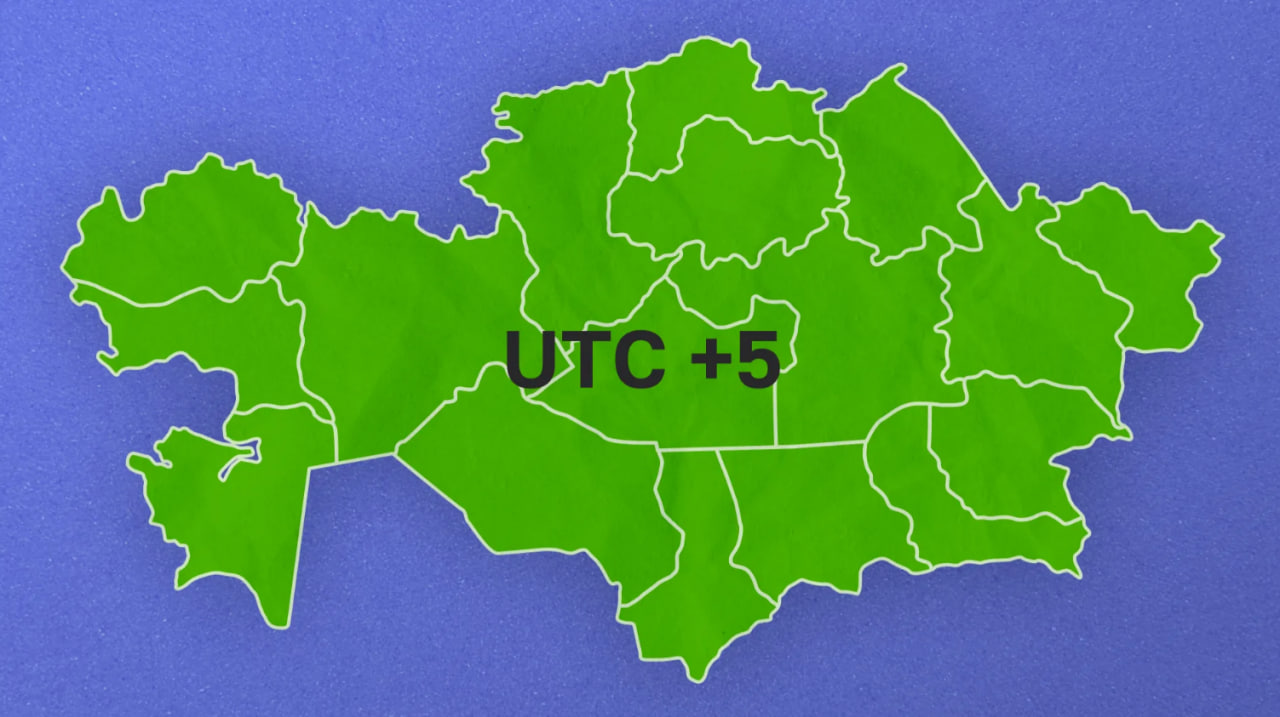
- Map of Kazakhstan time zones
Current time
Kazakhstan Time (UTC+5)	10:21 am, July 11, 2026 [refresh]

Time in Russia: KALT / Kaliningrad Time / UTC+2 / (MSK−1); MSK / Moscow Time / UTC+3 / (MSK±0); SAMT / Samara Time / UTC+4 / (MSK+1); YEKT / Yekaterinburg Time / UTC+5 / (MSK+2); OMST / Omsk Time / UTC+6 / (MSK+3); KRAT / Krasnoyarsk Time / UTC+7 / (MSK+4); IRKT / Irkutsk Time / UTC+8 / (MSK+5); YAKT / Yakutsk Time / UTC+9 / (MSK+6); VLAT / Vladivostok Time / UTC+10 / (MSK+7); MAGT / Magadan Time / UTC+11 / (MSK+8); PETT / Kamchatka Time / UTC+12 / (MSK+9)

UTC+05:00 is an identifier for a time offset from UTC of +05:00. This time is used in:

== As standard time (year-round) ==
Principal cities: Astana, Almaty, Kokshetau, Tashkent, Ashgabat, Dushanbe, Malé, Yekaterinburg, Martin-de-Viviès, Port-aux-Français, Aktobe, Atyrau, Kyzylorda, Aktau, Islamabad, Karachi

=== South Asia ===
- Maldives – Time in the Maldives
- Pakistan - Time in Pakistan

=== Central Asia ===
- Kazakhstan – Time in Kazakhstan
- Tajikistan – Time in Tajikistan
- Turkmenistan – Time in Turkmenistan
- Uzbekistan – Time in Uzbekistan

=== Eastern Europe ===
- Russia – Yekaterinburg Time
- Volga Federal District
  - Bashkortostan, Orenburg Oblast and Perm Krai
- Ural Federal District
  - Chelyabinsk Oblast, Khanty-Mansi Autonomous Okrug, Kurgan Oblast, Sverdlovsk Oblast, Tyumen Oblast and Yamalo-Nenets Autonomous Okrug

=== Antarctica ===
==== Southern Ocean ====
- France
  - Kerguelen Islands
  - Île Saint Paul and Île Amsterdam
- Australia
  - Heard Island and McDonald Islands
- Some bases in Antarctica. See also Time in Antarctica.
  - Australia
    - Mawson Station
  - Russia
    - Vostok Station

Armenia and Azerbaijan used this as daylight saving time (DST) in 1981–2012 and 1981–2016 respectively, called Armenia Summer Time (AMST) and Azerbaijan Summer Time (AZST).

== Discrepancies between official UTC+05:00 and geographical UTC+05:00 ==
=== Areas in UTC+05:00 longitudes using other time zones ===
Using UTC+08:00:

- China
  - Parts of western areas in the country, including western Xinjiang province (Kashgar) (although most locals observe UTC+06:00)

Using UTC+07:00:

- Russia
  - Most parts of Novosibirsk Oblast
  - Partly of Tomsk Oblast

Using UTC+06:00:

- Kyrgyzstan
- British Indian Ocean Territory
- Russia
  - Omsk Oblast

Using UTC+05:45:

- Nepal
  - Parts of western in the country, including:
    - Sudurpashchim
    - mostly part of Karnali
    - western part of Lumbini

Using UTC+05:30:

- Sri Lanka
- India, with parts of its territories:
  - Gujarat
  - Rajasthan
  - Punjab
  - Ladakh
  - Uttarakhand
  - Maharashtra
  - Telangana
  - Karnataka
  - Kerala
  - Haryana
  - Tamil Nadu
  - Himachal Pradesh
  - Madhya Pradesh
  - Jammu and Kashmir
  - Delhi, including nation's capital New Delhi
  - A smaller parts of Odisha
    - Most parts of Uttar Pradesh
    - Most parts of Andhra Pradesh
    - Southwest of Chhattisgarh

Using UTC+04:30:

- Afghanistan
  - Eastern parts, where the nation's capital Kabul is

Using UTC+03:00:

- Russia
  - The very east of Severny Island with 69°2' E as the easternmost point

=== Areas outside UTC+05:00 longitudes using UTC+05:00 time ===
==== Areas between 82°30' E and 97°30' E ("physical" UTC+06:00) ====
- Russia
  - The very easternmost parts of Ural Federal District
- Kazakhstan
  - Parts of East Kazakhstan

==== Areas between 52°30' E and 67°30' E ("physical" UTC+04:00) ====
- Turkmenistan
- Kazakhstan
  - Aktobe
  - Kyzylorda
  - Kostanay
  - parts of Mangystau, Atyrau, and West Kazakhstan
- Uzbekistan
  - Most parts, including Samarkand
- Pakistan
  - Western parts, including Karachi
- Russia
  - Most parts of Ural Federal District

==== Areas between 37°30' E and 52°30' E ("physical" UTC+03:00) ====
- Russia
  - Western tip of Perm Krai
  - Western parts of the Orenburg Oblast

== Historical time offsets ==
Kyrgyzstan adopted this time zone as its standard time from 2 May 1924 to 21 June 1930, and from 31 March 1991 to 12 August 2005.

== See also ==
- Pakistan Standard Time
- Time in Kazakhstan
- Time in Pakistan
- Time in Russia
- Time in Tajikistan
- Time in Uzbekistan
