= Purpe =

River in Russia

Physical characteristics
- Mouth: Pyakupur
  - coordinates: 64°42′08″N 77°21′36″E
- Length: 327 km (203 mi)
- Basin size: 5,110 km^{2} (1,970 sq mi)

Basin features
- Progression: Pyakupur→ Pur→ Kara Sea

The Purpe (Russian: Пурпе) is a river in the Yamalo-Nenets Autonomous Okrug, Russia. It is the left tributary of the Pyakupur. The Purpe is 327 kilometres (203 mi) long. The area of the watershed is 5,110 square kilometres (1,970 sq mi). The most significant tributary is the Puritey.

Flooding normally begins in May, sometimes at the end of April, peaking in two weeks and will end in the second half of June. The average duration of approximately two months, from mid-May to mid-July. The biggest difference between the water level in the lower reaches is approximately 4 metres (13 ft). The average water flow is about 50 cubic metres per second (1,800 cu ft/s), and the total annual runoff is about 1.5 cubic kilometres (0.36 mi^{3}), of which half runs during floods. In summer and autumn are generally low rainfall floods. The most abounding month - June, the low - March and April. River freezes usually in the second - the third decade of October, an average of 18 - 20 numbers, opened at the end of May. Freeze and an autopsy is accompanied by short ice. The average length of ice about 220 days. The average thickness of the ice at the end of winter 80 – 85 cm River are some deposits of hydrocarbon raw materials (Umseyskoe, Gubkinskoe, Purpeyskoe Southern, Eastern Purpeyskoe, Novopur-peyskoe, Komsomolskaya, North Komsomolskaya etc.)
