= Nakhodka, Yamalo-Nenets Autonomous Okrug =

Village in Yamalo-Nenets Autonomous Okrug, Russia

Coordinates: 67°43′14″N 77°39′42″E

Nakhodka (Russian: Нахо́дка) is a village (selo) in Tazovsky District of Yamalo-Nenets Autonomous Okrug, Russia, located on the Taz River. Population: 2,676 (2005 est.).

There is big natural gas and an oil field near the village, which is being developed by LUKoil.

The climate in the village is very harsh. Summers are very short and cool, while in winter temperatures can be as low as −50 °C (−58 °F).
