= Arctic LNG 2 =

Project in the Gydan Peninsula, Russia

Arctic LNG 2 LLC
- Type: LLC
- Founded: 5 June 2014
- Founder: PJSC Novatek
- Headquarters: Yamalo-Nenets Autonomous Okrug, Novy Urengoy
- Key people: CEO Oleg Karpushin
- Products: Liquefied natural gas, gas condensate
- Parent: Novatek
- Website: arcticspg.ru

Arctic LNG 2 (Арктик СПГ 2) is a Novatek project for the extraction of natural gas and the production of liquefied natural gas on the Gydan Peninsula, across the Ob Bay from Yamal.

== Description ==
Arctic LNG 2 is Novatek's second large scale LNG project after Yamal LNG. Its three trains, each with a planned capacity of 6 million tonnes per year, are expected to have a combined capacity of 19.8 million tonnes, or more than 27 billion cubic metres. The facility was planned to be commissioned in stages from 2023, with the first train scheduled for 2023, the second for 2024, and the third for 2026.

The project is expected to produce 19.8 million tonnes of LNG annually, compared with 16.5 million tonnes at Yamal LNG, as well as 1.6 million tonnes of stable gas condensate.

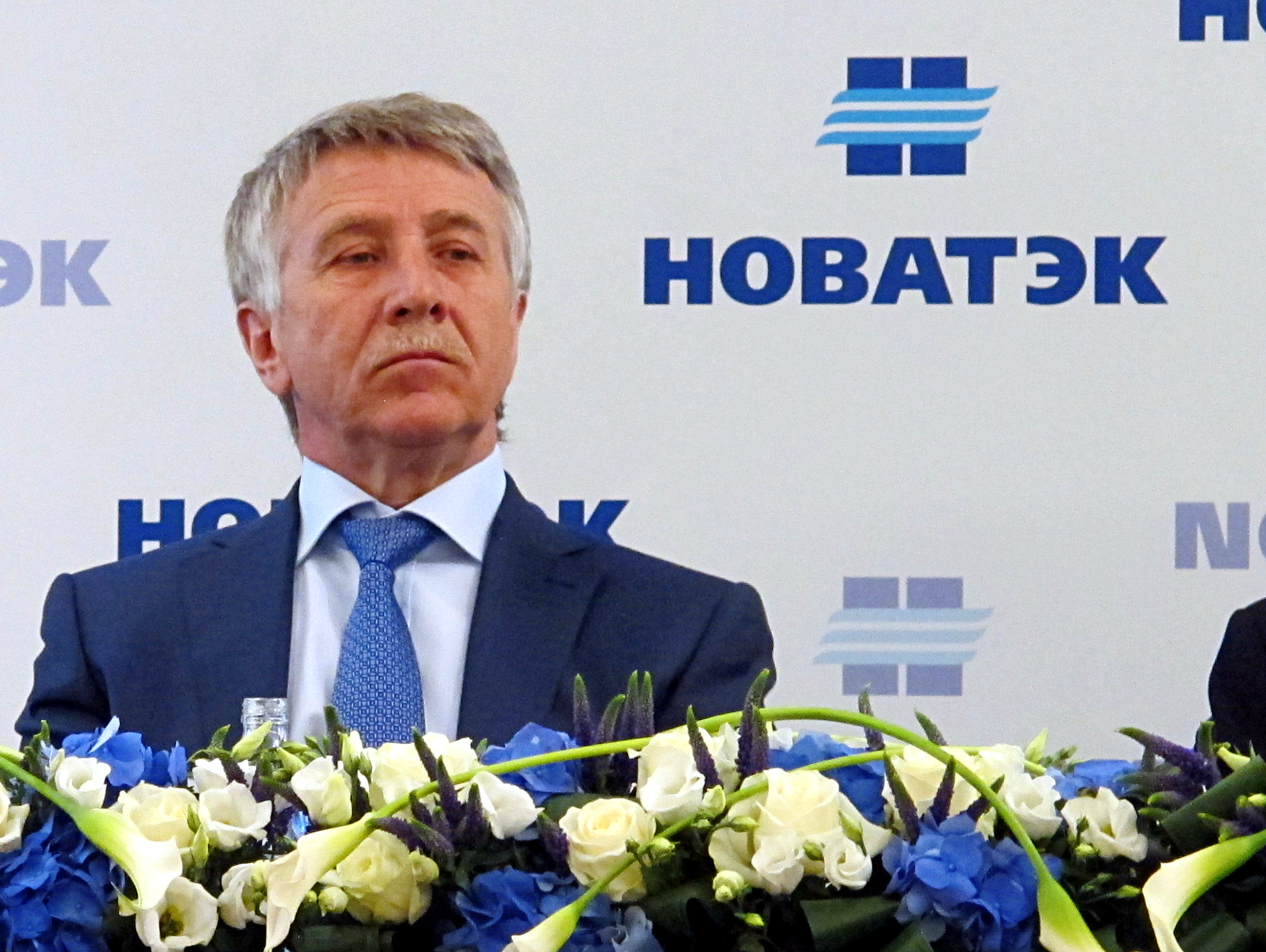
Leonid Mikhelson at Novatek's annual shareholders' meeting, 2016.

The project obtained licences for the Salmanovskoye field and the Shtormovoye field, and secured the right to export liquefied natural gas alongside Novatek's other projects: Yamal LNG, Arctic LNG 1, a planned project on the Gydan Peninsula, and Arctic LNG 3, based on the North Ob federal licence block in the waters of the Ob Bay.

The project is being developed using gravity-based structures. By shifting major construction work away from the field site itself, the developers said they would reduce the project's environmental impact.

In 2021, Utrenniy Airport was built to provide year-round transport for rotational personnel travelling to the Utrenneye field.

== History ==
For the project's shipping needs, 21 ice class LNG carriers of the Arc7 type were contracted: 15 from the Zvezda Shipbuilding Complex in Russia and six from Hanwha Ocean in South Korea. On 24 October 2017, Novatek chairman Leonid Mikhelson said that the company had handed over the documentation required for the construction of fifteen Arctic class LNG carriers for Arctic LNG 2 to Zvezda Shipyard.

In January 2019, Novatek signed equipment supply contracts worth more than US$5 billion, or about one quarter of the project's projected cost.

In mid 2019, Sovcomflot and Zvezda Shipyard signed a contract for four additional LNG carriers to transport LNG from Arctic LNG 2. The vessels were to be delivered by 2025. The order was directly linked to plans for the rapid development of the eastern route, with a transshipment hub being built in Kamchatka.

In December 2019, SAREN, a joint venture of the Italian company Saipem and Turkey's Renaissance Construction, part of Rönesans Holding, received a US$2.2 billion contract to build gravity-based structures for the project.

On 28 June 2019, following a meeting between Russian President Vladimir Putin and Japanese Prime Minister Shinzo Abe, an agreement was signed under which Japan would invest US$3 billion in the development of Arctic LNG 2.

By the end of 2020, the project was reported to be 32 percent complete, while the first train was 46 percent complete.

In May 2021, a group of 39 European lawmakers, mostly from Alliance 90/The Greens in the European Parliament, including Rasmus Andresen, urged the leaders of Germany, France, and Italy in a letter to withdraw support for the US$21 billion Russian Arctic LNG project because of climate concerns.

By November 2021, output from Arctic LNG 2 for the plant's first two years of operation had already been sold, and contracts with deliveries beginning in 2025 and 2026 were under discussion.

By the end of 2021, the project was reported to be 59 percent complete, while the first train was 78 percent complete.

Leonid Mikhelson said that the first train would be launched in 2023, the second in 2024, and the third in 2026, and he argued that the project's investments would in any case pay back three to four times over.

Journalists from Le Monde and Der Spiegel reported that, since February 2022, companies from the United Kingdom, Italy, and the United States had shipped equipment for Arctic LNG 2 to Russia. Russian customs data indicated that equipment worth US$400 million had arrived from Europe since February of the previous year. According to the reports, this allowed Russia to complete the project's first production train on schedule in July 2023 despite sanctions.

In October 2022, Mikhelson also said that Novatek had obtained all equipment needed for Arctic LNG 2 before sanctions were imposed and that the second and third trains would be launched on schedule.

In December 2023, reports said that force majeure disruptions had affected supplies involving Chinese and Spanish participants. Sanctions also raised the possibility that the project could take longer than expected to reach full LNG capacity.

== Sanctions ==
On 14 September 2023, amid the Russian invasion of Ukraine, the United States Department of the Treasury added to its blocking sanctions list the companies providing construction and engineering services for Arctic LNG 2. Companies and vessels involved in the logistics chain used to transport LNG from Yamal LNG and Arctic LNG 2 were also sanctioned.

On 2 November 2023, Arctic LNG 2 itself was placed under US blocking sanctions targeting Russia's energy production and export capabilities.

On 22 February 2024, the project was added to the United Kingdom's sanctions list for operating in a sector considered strategically significant to the Russian government.

=== Impact ===
In 2022, after sanctions were imposed and access to Western technology and equipment was lost, the Russian authorities lowered their 2035 LNG production forecast from 140 million tonnes to 80 to 120 million tonnes. US sanctions disrupted and severely complicated existing gas supply contracts as well as the chartering of LNG carriers. Kommersant reported that sanctions against Arctic LNG 2, whose first liquefaction train with a capacity of 6.6 million tonnes was expected to come online in early 2024, dismantled the project's logistics model, which had relied on transferring LNG to storage vessels in Murmansk and Kamchatka. US sanctions also blocked the delivery of three completed vessels from Hanwha Ocean because their customer, structures linked to Sovcomflot, had been placed under US blocking sanctions. As a result, as of 2024, Novatek had no fleet available for shipments from Arctic LNG 2 despite the launch of the project's first train.

On 21 December 2023, Novatek sent force majeure notices to prospective LNG buyers. The project's Chinese shareholders, CNPC and CNOOC, appealed to the US government for exemptions from the sanctions imposed on Arctic LNG 2. The Chinese, French, and Japanese shareholders in the project also declared force majeure and suspended their participation.

On 2 April 2024, Reuters reported that Novatek had suspended production at Arctic LNG 2 because of sanctions and a shortage of tankers. According to The Wall Street Journal, the project had effectively ceased operations because of US sanctions, with the plant only recirculating gas that had already been produced.

In 2025, systematic deliveries of LNG from the project to China began in August.

== Fleet ==
Novatek is building six Arc7 ice class LNG carriers for the project.

Three of them, Pyotr Kapitsa, Lev Landau, and Zhores Alferov, are being built for structures linked to Sovcomflot. The other three, Ilya Mechnikov, Nikolay Semyonov, and Nikolay Basov, were ordered by the Japanese company Mitsui O.S.K. Lines. In 2022, Hanwha terminated its contract with the Russian company because of payment difficulties, although construction of the LNG carriers continued.

== Project participants ==
As of 2021, the project's participants were:

- Novatek – 60%
- Total – 10%
- CNPC – 10%
- CNOOC – 10%
- Japan Arctic LNG, a consortium of Mitsui & Co. and JOGMEC – 10%

By December 2023, foreign companies had frozen their participation in the project because of sanctions imposed in connection with the Russian invasion of Ukraine.

== See also ==
- Arctic LNG 1
- Yamal LNG
