= Nakhodkinskoye gas field =

Gas field in Yamalo-Nenets Autonomous Okrug, Russia

Nakhodkinskoye
- Location within Russia
- Country: Russia
- Region: Yamalo-Nenets Autonomous Okrug
- Offshore/onshore: onshore
- Coordinates: 68°00′12″N 78°00′48″E
- Operator: Lukoil

Field history
- Discovery: 2005
- Start of development: 2005
- Start of production: 2005

Production
- Current production of gas: 17×10^{6} m^{3}/d 602×10^{6} cu ft/d
- Estimated oil in place: 9 million tonnes (~ 10×10^{6} m^{3} or 66 million bbl)
- Estimated gas in place: 250×10^{9} m^{3} 8.828×10^{12} cu ft

The Nakhodkinskoye gas field is a natural gas field located in the Yamalo-Nenets Autonomous Okrug. It was discovered in 2005 and developed by and Lukoil. It began production in 2005 and produces natural gas and condensates. The total proven reserves of the Nakhodkinskoye gas field are around 8.828 trillion cubic feet (250 billion m³), and production is slated to be around 602 million cubic feet/day (17×10^{5}m³) in 2010.
