= 80th meridian east =

Line of longitude

80th meridian east (interactive map)

The meridian 80° east of Greenwich is a line of longitude that extends from the North Pole across the Arctic Ocean, Asia, the Indian Ocean, the Southern Ocean, and Antarctica to the South Pole.

The 80th meridian east forms a great circle with the 100th meridian west.

== From Pole to Pole ==
Starting at the North Pole and heading south to the South Pole, the 80th meridian east passes through:

Co-ordinates	Country, territory or sea	Notes
90°0′N 80°0′E	Arctic Ocean	
81°7′N 80°0′E	Kara Sea	
80°58′N 80°0′E	Russia	Krasnoyarsk Krai — Ushakov Island
80°50′N 80°0′E	Kara Sea	Passing just west of Dikson Island, Krasnoyarsk Krai, Russia
72°11′N 80°0′E	Russia	Krasnoyarsk Krai; Yamalo-Nenets Autonomous Okrug — from 71°8′N 80°0′E; Krasnoyarsk Krai — from 70°19′N 80°0′E; Yamalo-Nenets Autonomous Okrug — from 69°22′N 80°0′E; Khanty-Mansi Autonomous Okrug — from 62°48′N 80°0′E; Tomsk Oblast — from 60°40′N 80°0′E; Novosibirsk Oblast — from 56°37′N 80°0′E; Altai Krai — from 53°57′N 80°0′E
50°51′N 80°0′E	Kazakhstan	
44°58′N 80°0′E	China	Xinjiang – for about 18 km
44°48′N 80°0′E	Kazakhstan	
42°22′N 80°0′E	Kyrgyzstan	
42°2′N 80°0′E	China	Xinjiang
35°27′N 80°0′E	Aksai Chin	Disputed between India and China
34°39′N 80°0′E	China	Tibet
30°52′N 80°0′E	Aksai Chin	Disputed between India and China – for about 4 km
30°50′N 80°0′E	India	Uttarakhand; Uttar Pradesh — from 28°43′N 80°0′E; Madhya Pradesh — from 25°17′N 80°0′E; Maharashtra — from 21°32′N 80°0′E; Telangana — from 18°46′N 80°0′E; Andhra Pradesh — from 16°42′N 80°0′E; Tamil Nadu — from 13°29′N 80°0′E
12°14′N 80°0′E	Indian Ocean	Bay of Bengal
9°48′N 80°0′E	Sri Lanka	Jaffna Peninsula
9°36′N 80°0′E	Indian Ocean	Palk Strait
9°0′N 80°0′E	Sri Lanka	Bentota
6°24′N 80°0′E	Indian Ocean	
60°0′S 80°0′E	Southern Ocean	
68°2′S 80°0′E	Antarctica	Australian Antarctic Territory, claimed by Australia

== See also ==
- 79th meridian east
- 81st meridian east
