= Oleny Island =

Island in the Kara Sea

Coordinates: 72.43°N 77.61°E

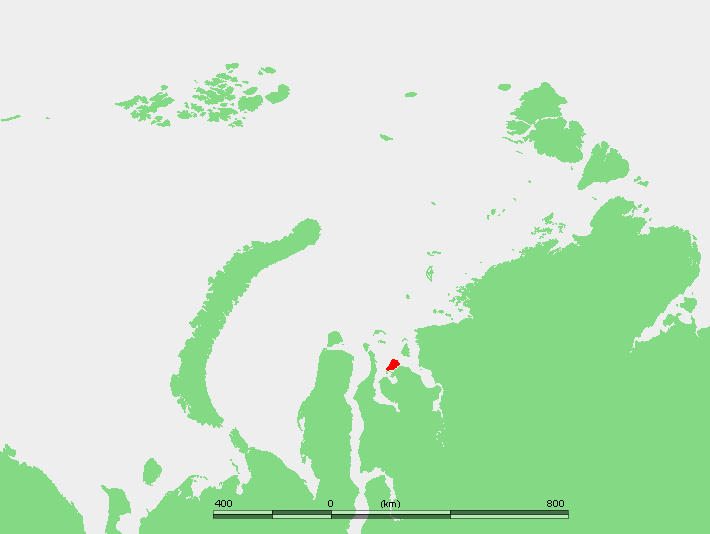
Location of Oleny Island in the Kara Sea.

Oleny Island (also spelt as Oleniy and Oleni) (Russian: Остров Олений) is a single island in the Kara Sea just a few kilometers offshore, north of the coast of one of the arms of the Gyda Peninsula in North Siberia. It is covered with tundra and swamps and it is 53 km in length and its average width is 27 km, having an area of 1197 km². Its latitude is 72° 24' N and the longitude 77° 45' E. To the northeast lies Sibiryakov Island.

The sea surrounding Oleny Island is covered with pack ice in the winter and there are numerous ice floes even in the summer, so that it is often merged with the Gydan Peninsula in the Siberian mainland, from which is separated by a narrow, only 2 km wide, strait.

Oleny Island belongs to the Yamalo-Nenets Autonomous Okrug which is the northern part of the Tyumen Oblast administrative division of the Russian Federation. Oleny is also part of the Great Arctic State Nature Reserve, the largest nature reserve of Russia .

This island is not to be confused with other single islands called "Oleny" or "Oleniy" (Russian: Ostrov Oleny), one of which is located in the Kara Sea itself, in the Plavnikovyye group, while the others are in the Barents Sea and in the White Sea.

== Adjacent islands ==
- Off Oleny Island's southwestern tip lie three small islands known as Proklyatye Islands (Проклятые острова; Proklyatye ostrova) at 72° 15' N of latitude and 77° 05' E of longitude.
- Rovny Island is located close to the mainland coast, a few km east of the Proklyatye Islands.
