= Sibiryakov Island =

Island in the Kara Sea

Coordinates: 72°54′N 79°11′E

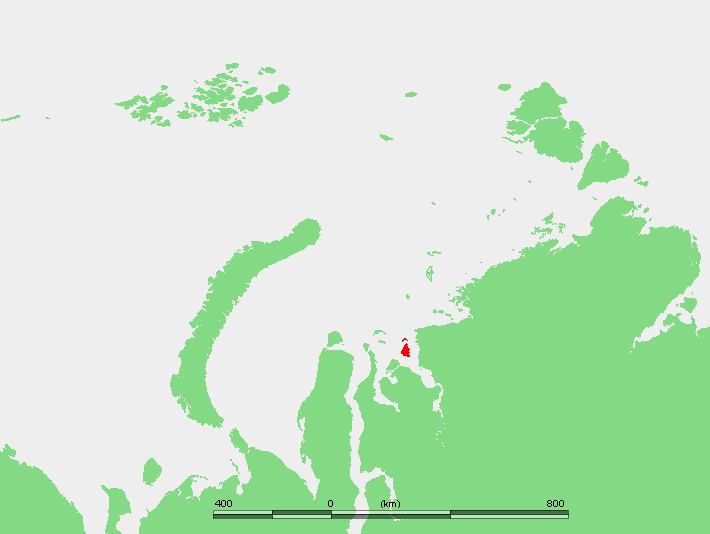
Location of Sibiryakov Island in the Kara Sea.

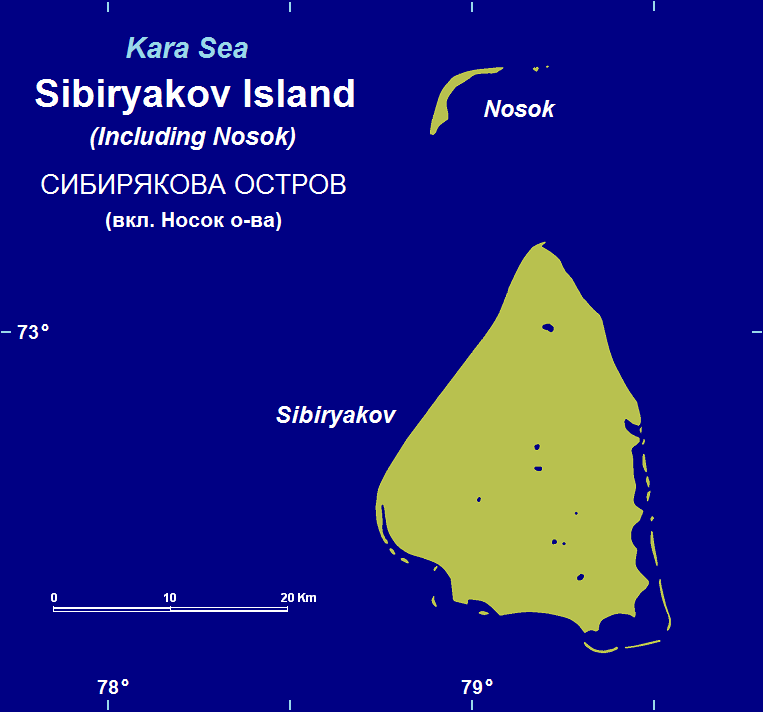
Sibiryakov Island and its smaller northern neighbor Nosok.

Sibiryakov Island or Sibiryakow Island (Russian: Остров Сибирякова, Ostrov Sibiryakova), also known as Kuz'kin Island (Кузькин остров), is an island in the Kara Sea, off the northern end of the estuary of the Yenisei river. It belongs to the Krasnoyarsk Krai administrative division of the Russian Federation and is named after Aleksandr Mikhaylovich Sibiryakov, an Imperial Russian gold-mine proprietor. Sibiryakov financed explorations to Siberia, such as Nordenskiöld's, and also took part in some expeditions of his own.

== Geography ==
The island has an area of 800 square kilometres (310 square miles). Its length is 38 kilometres (24 miles) and its maximum width 27 kilometres (17 miles). It lies just 35 kilometres (22 miles) from the nearest coast. The sea surrounding Sibiryakov Island is covered with pack ice in the winter and there are numerous ice floes even in the summer. The strait between Sibiryakov Island and the mainland is known as Vostochnyy Proliv. Some 12 km off Sibiryakov Island's northern cape lies a narrow and curved group of three islands known as Nosok Island (Остров Носок; Ostrov Nosok).

== Environment ==
Sibiryakov is part of the Great Arctic State Nature Reserve, the largest nature reserve of Russia, and is covered with tundra vegetation.

The island regularly supports a significant population of greater white-fronted geese. It has been recognised as an Important Bird Area (IBA) by BirdLife International.

== See also ==
- Kara Sea
