= Shokalsky Island =

Island in Russia

Coordinates: 72°58′00″N 74°27′00″E

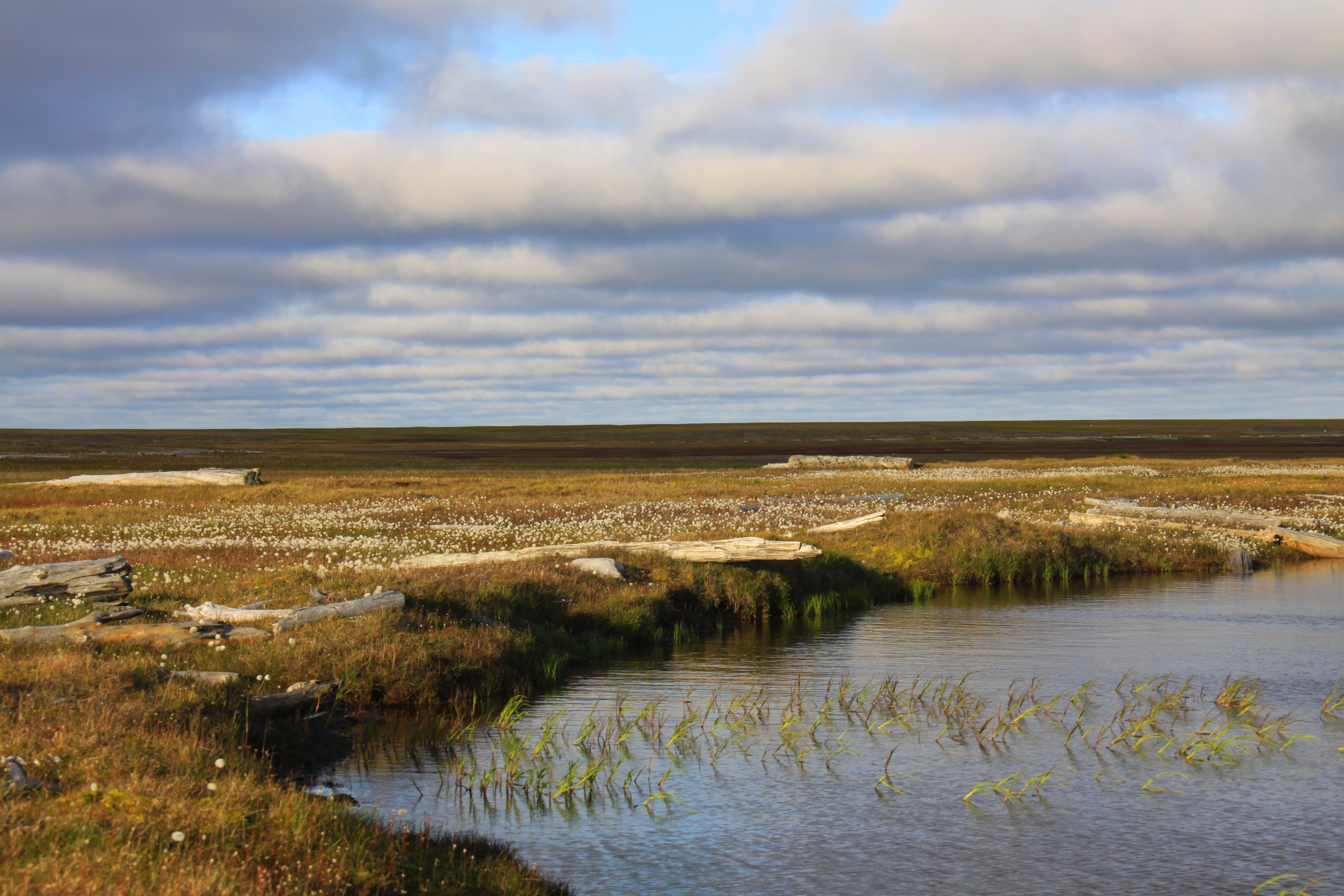
Shokalsky Island

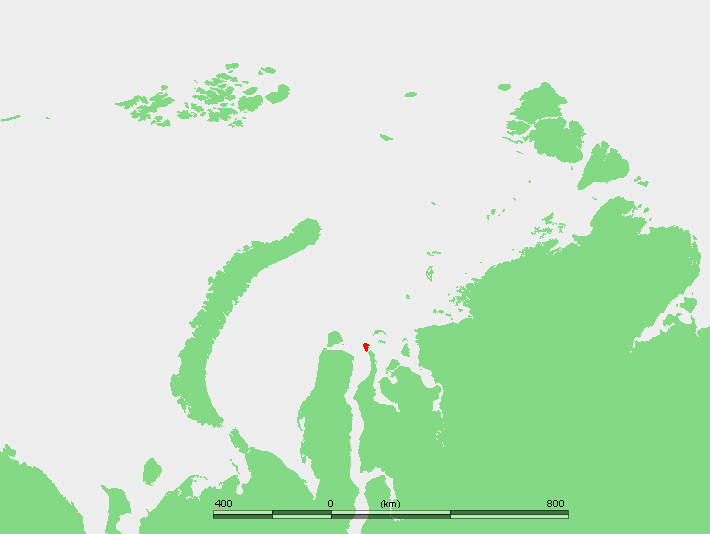
Location of Shokalsky Island in the Kara Sea.

Shokalsky Island (Russian: Остров Шокальского) is an island in the Kara Sea, in Russia. It is located on the eastern side of the mouth of the Ob River, off the tip of the narrow northwestern arm of the Gyda Peninsula. It is separated from it by a narrow strait full of islets known as Gydanskiy Proliv.

Its latitude is 72° 58' N and its longitude 74° 27' E.

The island has an area of 428 km^{2} and it is covered by tundra. The sea surrounding the island is covered with pack ice in the winter and there are numerous ice floes even in the summer, so that it is often merged with the Gydanskiy Peninsula in the Siberian mainland.

This island belongs to the Yamalo-Nenets Autonomous Okrug which is the northern part of the Tyumen Oblast administrative division of the Russian Federation. This island is also part of the Great Arctic State Nature Reserve, the largest nature reserve of Russia.

This island was named after Imperial Russian cartographer Yuly Shokalsky.

Shokalsky Island should not be confused with a little islet also called "Ostrov Shokal'skogo" which is located off the western coast of Vaygach Island in the Barents Sea.

== See also ==
- Kara Sea
