= Tazovsky (rural locality) =

Rural locality in Russia

Coordinates: 67°29′N 78°43′E

Tazovsky (Russian: Та́зовский) is a rural locality (a settlement) and the administrative center of Tazovsky District in Yamalo-Nenets Autonomous Okrug, Russia, located on the Taz River 12 kilometers (7.5 mi) from its fall into the Taz Estuary. Population: 6,793 (2010 census); 5,965 (2002 census); 6,985 (1989 Soviet census).

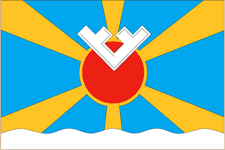
Flag of Tazovsky

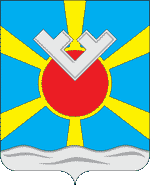
Coat of arms of Tazovsky

Tazovsky Airport (ICAO airport code: USDT) is located next to Tazovsky.

== History ==
Until 1949, it was known as Khalmer-Sede (Хальмер-Седэ)—a Nenets name literally meaning the hill of the dead, due to an old Nenets cemetery at this location. It had urban-type settlement status until January 1, 2013.

== Climate ==
Climate data for Tazovsky, 1991–2020 normals, extremes 1932–present
Month	Jan	Feb	Mar	Apr	May	Jun	Jul	Aug	Sep	Oct	Nov	Dec	Year
Record high °C (°F)	0.3 (32.5)	1.9 (35.4)	3.7 (38.7)	7.1 (44.8)	26.0 (78.8)	32.3 (90.1)	33.0 (91.4)	30.0 (86.0)	25.4 (77.7)	15.9 (60.6)	3.1 (37.6)	3.2 (37.8)	33.0 (91.4)
Mean daily maximum °C (°F)	−21.4 (−6.5)	−20.2 (−4.4)	−12.9 (8.8)	−6.9 (19.6)	0.2 (32.4)	12.9 (55.2)	19.1 (66.4)	15.2 (59.4)	8.0 (46.4)	−2.5 (27.5)	−14.0 (6.8)	−18.8 (−1.8)	−3.4 (25.8)
Daily mean °C (°F)	−25.4 (−13.7)	−24.2 (−11.6)	−17.4 (0.7)	−11.4 (11.5)	−3.0 (26.6)	8.8 (47.8)	14.7 (58.5)	11.4 (52.5)	4.9 (40.8)	−5.2 (22.6)	−17.9 (−0.2)	−22.8 (−9.0)	−7.3 (18.9)
Mean daily minimum °C (°F)	−29.4 (−20.9)	−28.3 (−18.9)	−21.9 (−7.4)	−15.9 (3.4)	−6.2 (20.8)	5.3 (41.5)	10.6 (51.1)	8.0 (46.4)	2.1 (35.8)	−8.0 (17.6)	−21.7 (−7.1)	−26.8 (−16.2)	−11.0 (12.2)
Record low °C (°F)	−52.6 (−62.7)	−50.7 (−59.3)	−51.7 (−61.1)	−41.3 (−42.3)	−27.2 (−17.0)	−10.7 (12.7)	0.6 (33.1)	−2.5 (27.5)	−11.8 (10.8)	−33.2 (−27.8)	−45.9 (−50.6)	−51.0 (−59.8)	−52.6 (−62.7)
Average precipitation mm (inches)	44 (1.7)	41 (1.6)	46 (1.8)	43 (1.7)	38 (1.5)	51 (2.0)	54 (2.1)	67 (2.6)	51 (2.0)	56 (2.2)	44 (1.7)	44 (1.7)	579 (22.6)
Source: www.pogodaiklimat.ru
