= Gydan Bay =

Bay on the Siberian coast in the Kara Sea

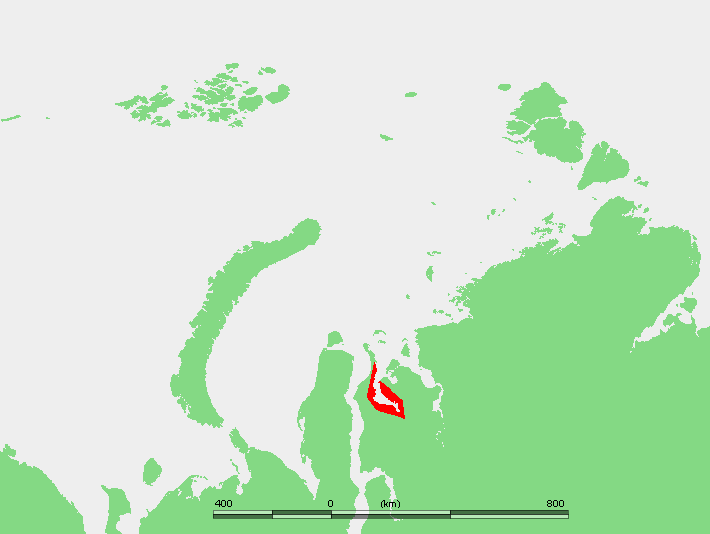
- Map showing the location of the Khalmyer Bay.

- Location within Yamalo-Nenets Autonomous Okrug
- Location: Gyda Peninsula, Kara Sea
- Coordinates: 71°30′N 76°0′E
- Basin countries: Russia
- Settlements: Gyda

The Gydan Bay (Russian: Гыданская губа) is a bay on the Siberian coast in the Kara Sea. It is located in the Gyda Peninsula and it is roughly 185 km long and 47 km wide at its widest point. Lat 71°30′ N, long 76° E.

== Geography ==
This deep bay lies between the large estuaries of the Ob (Gulf of Ob) and the Yenisei River. The peninsula formed between this bay and neighbouring Yuratski Bay is known as the Mamonta Peninsula (Russian: Полуостров Мамонта; Poluostrov Mamonta, meaning 'Mammoth Peninsula') and the narrow peninsula in the NW formed between this bay and the neighbouring Gulf of Ob is known as the Yavay Peninsula (Russian: полуостров Явай; Poluostrov Yavay).

The Gydan Bay is surrounded by tundra coast and there are numerous river mouths on its shores. Deep within the bay lies the settlement of Gyda. At its mouth lie the settlements of Matyuysale and Mongatalyang.

This Bay is located in the Yamal-Nenets autonomous district administrative region of the Russian Federation.

=== Khalmer Bay ===
The Khalmer Bay (Russian: Хальмер-Вонга) is a sub-bay of the Gydan Bay. Located at 71°17′N 77°47′E in the south of Mamonta Peninsula.
