= Gyda Peninsula =

Peninsula in Siberia, Russia

Гыда́нский полуостров (Russian)
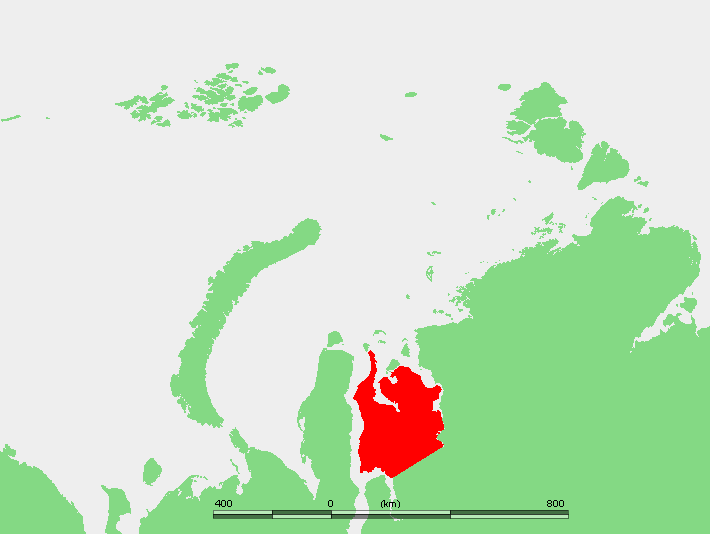
- Location of the Gyda Peninsula.
- Interactive map of Gyda Peninsula

Geography
- Location: Far North
- Coordinates: 70°N 79°E
- Adjacent to: Gulf of Ob; Kara Sea; Yenisei Gulf
- Area: 160,000 km^{2} (62,000 sq mi)
- Length: 400 km (250 mi)
- Width: 360 km (224 mi)
- Highest elevation: 1,125 m (3691 ft)

Administration
- Russia
- Federal subject: Yamal-Nenets autonomous district

The Gyda Peninsula (Russian: Гыда́нский полуо́стров, romanized: Gydansky poluostrov) is a geographical feature of the Siberian coast in the Kara Sea. It takes its name from the river Gyda, that flows on the peninsula. It is roughly 400 km long and 360 km wide. This wide peninsula lies between the estuaries of the Ob (Gulf of Ob) and Yenisei Rivers (Yenisei Gulf). The southwestern corner of the peninsula is limited by the Taz Estuary, and across the river lies the Yamal Peninsula. The climate in the whole area is arctic and harsh.

== Geography ==
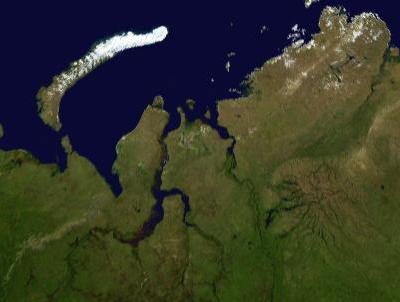
Satellite image of the Gyda Peninsula

The Gyda Peninsula is mostly flat, with numerous lakes and rivers. Tanama has its sources in the peninsula. Its ground consists of permafrost and is covered by tundra.

This peninsula has a few arms or subpeninsulas extending northwards into the Kara Sea, where there are some large islands off its shores, including Oleniy, Shokalsky and Vilkitsky Islands. There are two bays in its northern coast, narrow and deep Gydan Bay and smaller Yuratski Bay. The peninsula formed between the Gydan Bay and neighbouring Yuratski Bay is known as the Mamonta Peninsula (Russian: Полуостров Мамонта; Poluostrov Mamonta, meaning 'Mammoth Peninsula') and the narrow peninsula in the NW formed between this bay and the neighbouring Gulf of Ob is known as the Yavay Peninsula (Russian: полуостров Явай; Poluostrov Yavay).

The Gyda Peninsula is located in the Yamal-Nenets autonomous district administrative region of the Russian Federation. It appears also in the genitive as Gydansky or Gydanskiy Peninsula in many common maps in English.

== Archaeological site ==
A notable archeological find from the peninsula is a mammoth skeleton, now housed in a zoological museum in Saint Petersburg.

== Environmental protection ==
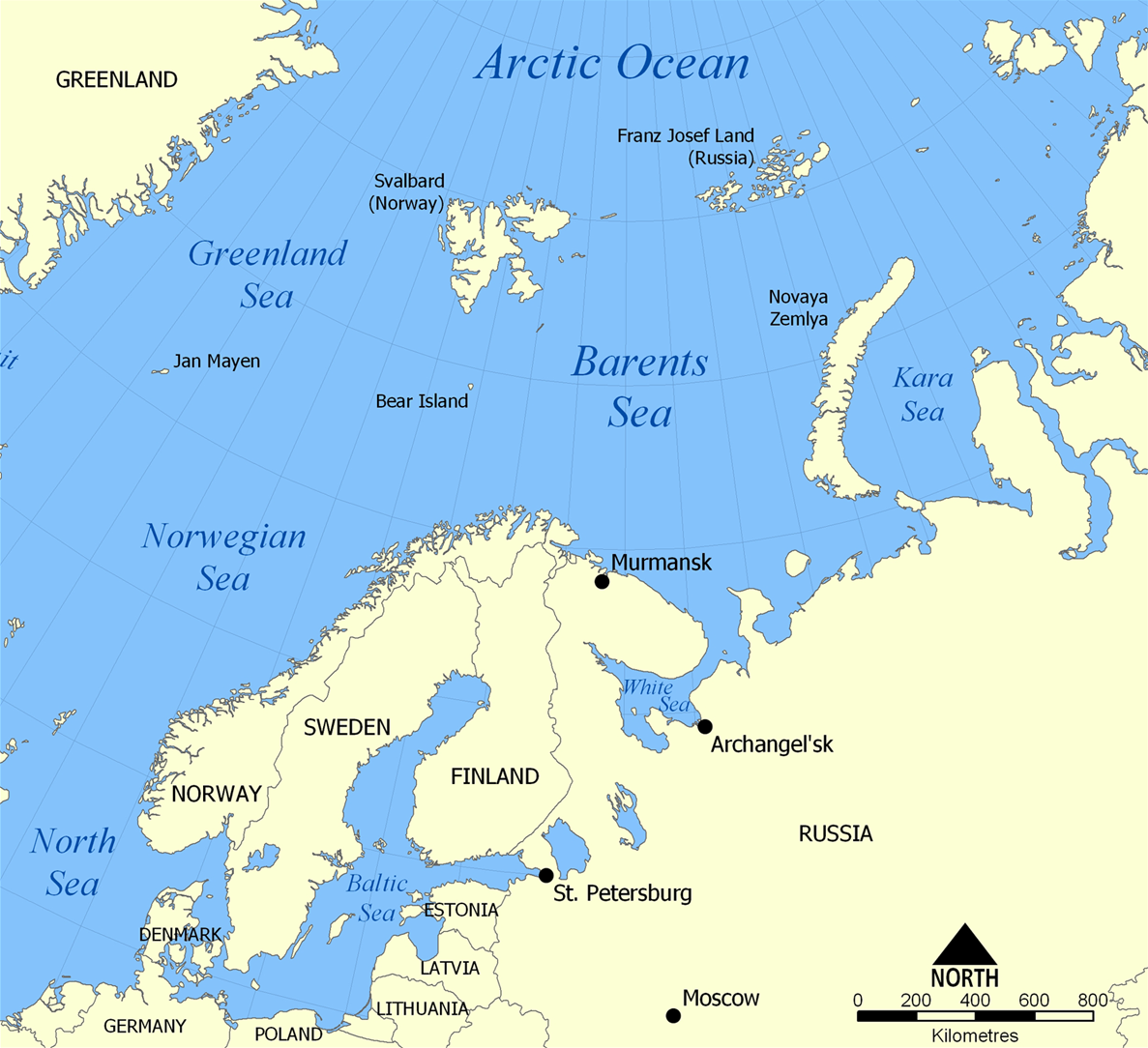
The Barents Sea and the Kara Sea, separated by Novaya Zemlya island, must be traversed on the way from the Gyda Peninsula to Murmansk or Arkhangelsk

In 1996 the northernmost 8 782 km^{2} was declared a nature reserve (zapovednik), with a general ban on traffic. The reserve Gyda Nature Reserve was administered from the region capital Tazovsky. 10 December 2019 the protected area was changed into a national park.

Since 2014, massive holes nearly 100 feet wide popped up on the ground of the peninsula, probably due to methane gas blowouts. In 2016, after a hiatus of 25 years (the local research station was closed in 1991), scientists were allowed back on the site to lead geo-cryological studies and monitor the permafrost.

In 2020, officially following the warmest summer recorded in the region since 1881, heavy masses of mud and permafrost started to slide into the sea of the Gydan Bay. The mudslides have also been attributed to the recent launch of the Arctic LNG 2 project, an enormous natural gas extraction site built in the region.

== Petroleum ==
The fossil gas company PAO Novatek has since 2019 had permission for natural gas extraction from a major part of the peninsula. In 2020 the company presented plans for construction of a major port on the Gulf of Ob for gas shipment. The port is called Utrenneye and the project is named Arctic LNG 2.

== See also ==
- Arctic cooperation and politics
