= Gulf of Ob =

Bay of the Arctic Ocean

- Обская губа (Russian)
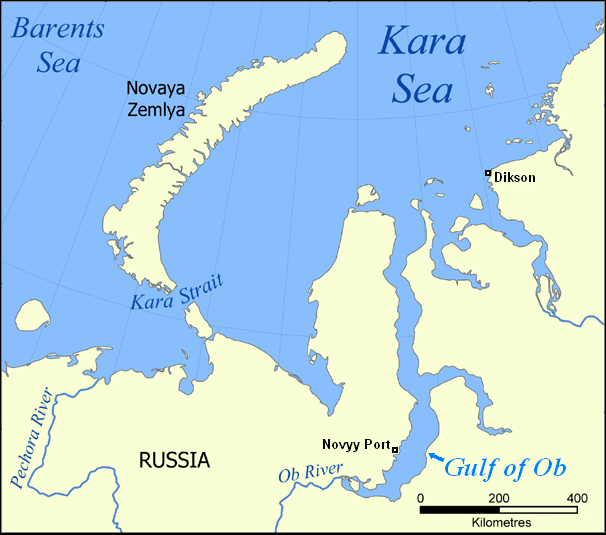
- Map showing the location of the Gulf of Ob.

- Location within Yamalo-Nenets Autonomous Okrug
- Location: Yamalo-Nenets Autonomous Okrug
- Coordinates: 68°50′N 73°30′E
- River sources: Ob
- Ocean/sea sources: Kara Sea
- Basin countries: Russia
- Average depth: 10–12 m (33–39 ft)

Ramsar Wetland
- Official name: Islands in Ob Estuary, Kara Sea
- Designated: 13 September 1994
- Reference no.: 676

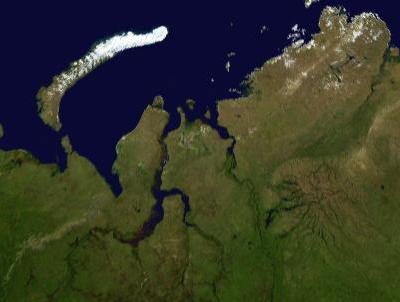
Satellite image of the Gulf of Ob

The Gulf of Ob (Russian: Обская губа, romanized: Obskaya guba), also known as the Bay of Ob (Russian: Обский залив, romanized: Obsky zaliv), is a bay of the Arctic Ocean, located in the north of Russia at the mouth of the Ob River. It is the world's longest estuary.

== Geography ==
The mouth of the Gulf of Ob is in the Kara Sea between the Gyda and Yamal peninsulas. It is about 1,000 km (620 mi) long and varies in width from about 50 to 80 km (31 to 50 mi). It generally runs north and south. The gulf is relatively shallow, with an average depth from 10 to 12 metres (33 to 39 ft), which restricts heavy sea transport. The Taz Estuary is an eastern side-branch formed by the Taz River.

There are several islands near the mouth of the Ob, at the beginning of the estuary, such as Khaley Island. All these islands are close to the shore and they are generally flat and low-lying. They were protected wetlands under Ramsar until July 2025. Further north, except for a few islands located close to the shore, such as Khalevigo and Nyavigo, the Gulf of Ob is free of islands until it meets the Kara Sea.

Beluga whales seasonally migrate to the Gulf of Ob.

== Fossil fuels ==
Very large natural gas and petroleum deposits have been discovered in this region. To the west is the Yamal project to develop resources in the Yamal Peninsula. To the south-east the Yamburg gas field is the world's third largest natural gas field, located between the southern portion of the gulf and the Taz Estuary to the east. Oil and gas from the wells are sent south via pipeline and rail transport.

A new port has been developed at Sabetta, on the west bank of the gulf, to support the Yamal LNG plant. Commercial operation started in December 2017 with the loading of the first LNG carrier.

Gazprom's Arctic Gate offshore oil loading terminal is in the gulf, designed to operate where ice could be over two meters thick.

The fossil gas company PAO Novatek has since 2019 had permission for natural gas extraction from a major part of the eastern shore Gyda Peninsula. In 2020 the company presented plans for construction of a major port for gas shipment. The port is called Utrenneye and the project is named Arctic LNG 2.
