= Taz Estuary =

Gulf formed by the Taz River

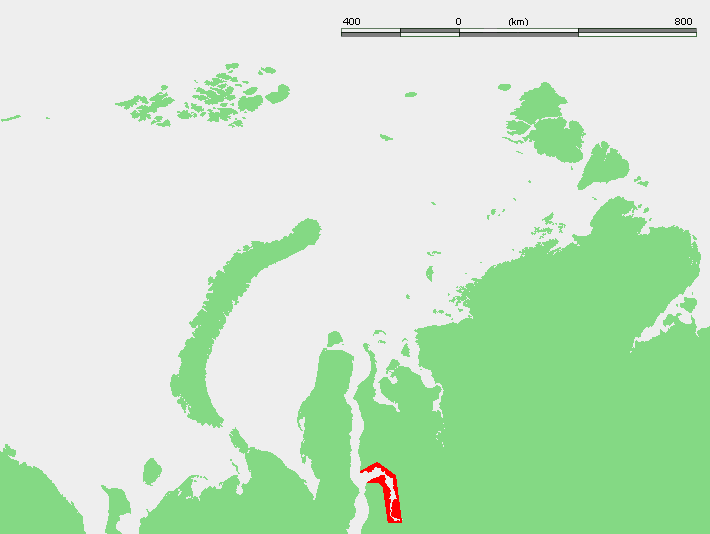
Location of the Taz Estuary

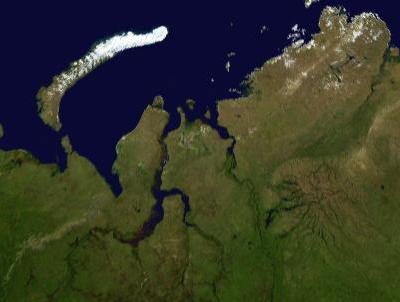
Satellite image of the Taz Estuary area

The Taz Estuary (Russian: Тазовская губа) is a long gulf formed by the Taz River. It consists of a roughly 330-kilometer (210 mi) long estuary that begins in the area of the settlement of Tazovsky and ends in the Gulf of Ob, which is connected with the Kara Sea. Its average width is about 25 kilometers (16 mi) and it is one of the biggest estuaries in the world.

It begins in the mouths of the Taz and the Pur Rivers in a roughly north–south direction at a latitude of 67° 30' N, and it bends westwards at a latitude of 69° N, widening further before joining the Gulf of Ob.

The Russian Gazprom company is investing in the expansion of gas production in the Taz Estuary area, where there are said to be huge reserves.

The area of the estuary was explored early. In the 19th century Estonian biologist and explorer Alexander von Middendorff found a frozen mammoth near the Taz Estuary. The body of the mammoth was transported to St. Petersburg in 1866.
