= Flag of Yamalo-Nenets Autonomous Okrug =

Flag of the Russian autonomous okrug of Yamalo-Nenets

Yamalo-Nenets Autonomous Okrug
- Proportion: 2:3
- Adopted: 28 November 1996
- Design: A blue field charged with a white crown ornament and a red strip near the bottom.
- Designed by: Gennady Sysolyatin

The flag of Yamalo-Nenets Autonomous Okrug consists of a blue field charged with a white crown ornament (seen also on the flag of Nenets Autonomous Okrug) and a red strip near the bottom. The flag was officially adopted on 28 November 1996.

== History ==
The flag of Yamalo-Nenets Autonomous Okrug was officially adopted on 28 November 1996.

== Design ==
The flag consists of a blue field with a red strip and a white Khor Lambey design on the lower part of it.

=== Similarity ===
The white crown design on the flag is also seen on the flag of Nenets Autonomous Okrug.

== Other flags ==
=== Governor's Standard ===
Flag	Date	Use	Description
	?–present	Standard used by the governor.	

=== Administrative divisions ===
Flag	Date	Use	Description
	1998–present	Flag of Salekhard	
	?–present	Flag of Gubkinsky	
	?–present	Flag of Nadym	
	?–present	Flag of Muravlenko	
	?–present	Flag of Novy Urengoy	
	?–present	Flag of Noyabrsk	
	?–present	Flag of Krasnoselkupsky District	
	?–present	Flag of Nadymsky District	
	?–present	Flag of Priuralsky District	
	?–present	Flag of Purovsky District	
	?–present	Flag of Tazovsky District	
	?–present	Flag of Shuryshkarsky District	
	?–present	Flag of Yamalsky District	

=== Settlements ===
Flag	Date	Use	Description
	?–present	Flag of Kharp	
	?–present	Flag of Krasnoselkup	
	?–present	Flag of Novy Port	
	?–present	Flag of Pangody	
	?–present	Flag of Tarko-Sale	
	?–present	Flag of Tazovsky	
	?–present	Flag of Zapolyarny	
