= Gubkinsky Urban Okrug =

Location of Belgorod Oblast in Russia

Location of Yamalo-Nenets Autonomous Okrug in Russia

Gubkinsky Urban Okrug is the name of several municipal formations in Russia:

- Gubkinsky Urban Okrug, Belgorod Oblast, a municipal formation in Belgorod Oblast, which the town of oblast significance of Gubkin and Gubkinsky District are incorporated as
- Gubkinsky Urban Okrug, a municipal formation in Yamalo-Nenets Autonomous Okrug, which the town of okrug significance of Gubkinsky is incorporated as

== See also ==
- Gubkinsky (disambiguation)
