= Zapolyarny (inhabited locality) =

Zapolyarny (Russian: Заполярный; masculine), Zapolyarnaya (Заполярная; feminine), or Zapolyarnoye (Заполярное; neuter) is the name of several urban localities in Russia:

- Zapolyarny, Murmansk Oblast, a town in Pechengsky District of Murmansk Oblast
- Zapolyarny, Komi Republic, an urban-type settlement under the administrative jurisdiction of Komsomolsky Urban-Type Settlement Administrative Territory under the administrative jurisdiction of the town of republic significance of Vorkuta in the Komi Republic
- Zapolyarny, Yamalo-Nenets Autonomous Okrug, an urban-type settlement in Nadymsky District of Yamalo-Nenets Autonomous Okrug
