= Administrative divisions of Yamalo-Nenets Autonomous Okrug =

Yamalo-Nenets Autonomous Okrug Russia
- Administrative center: Salekhard

Administrative structure (as of 2011)
- Districts: 7
- Towns: 8
- Urban-type settlements: 5
- Selsovets: 41

Municipal structure (as of 2002)
- Rural settlements: 102 (inhabited); 19 (uninhabited)

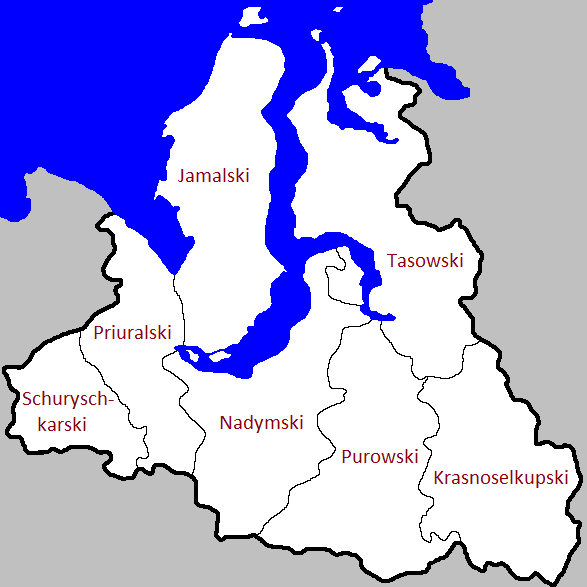
Map of Yamalo-Nenets Autonomous Okrug

Yamalo-Nenets Autonomous Okrug is a federal subject of Russia.

== Administrative and municipal divisions ==
Map

Division	Structure		OKATO	OKTMO	Urban-type settlement/ district-level town*	Rural (selsovet)
Division	Administrative	Municipal	OKATO	OKTMO	Urban-type settlement/ district-level town*	Rural (selsovet)
Salekhard (Салехард)	city	urban okrug	71 171	71 951		
Gubkinsky (Губкинский)	city	urban okrug	71 172	71 952		
Labytnangi (Лабытнанги)	city	urban okrug	71 173	71 953	Kharp (Харп)	
Nadym (Надым)	city	(under Nadymsky)	71 174	71 916		
Muravlenko (Муравленко)	city	urban okrug	71 175	71 955		
Novy Urengoy (Новый Уренгой)	city	urban okrug	71 176	71 956		
Noyabrsk (Ноябрьск)	city	urban okrug	71 178	71 958		1
Krasnoselkupsky (Красноселькупский)	district		71 153	71 913		3
Nadymsky (Надымский)	district	okrug	71 156	71 916	Pangody (Пангоды); Zapolyarny	8
Priuralsky (Приуральский)	district		71 158	71 918		6
Purovsky (Пуровский)	district	okrug	71 160	71 920	Tarko-Sale (Тарко-Сале) town*; Urengoy (Уренгой)	5
Tazovsky (Тазовский)	district	okrug	71 163	71 923	Tazovsky (Тазовский)	4
Shuryshkarsky (Шурышкарский)	district		71 166	71 926		8
Yamalsky (Ямальский)	district		71 168	71 928		6
