= Zapolyarny =

Zapolyarny (masculine), Zapolyarnaya (feminine), or Zapolyarnoye (neuter) may refer to:

- Zapolyarny District, a district of Nenets Autonomous Okrug, Russia
- Zapolyarny Urban Settlement, several municipal urban settlements in Russia
- Zapolyarny (inhabited locality) (Zapolyarnaya, Zapolyarnoye), several inhabited localities in Russia
