= Zapolyarny Urban Settlement =

Zapolyarny Urban Settlement is the name of several municipal formations in Russia.

- Zapolyarny Urban Settlement, a municipal formation which the Town of Zapolyarny in Pechengsky District of Murmansk Oblast is incorporated as
- Zapolyarny Urban Settlement, a municipal formation which the urban-type settlement of Zapolyarny in Nadymsky District of Yamalo-Nenets Autonomous Okrug is incorporated as
