= Tarko-Sale =

Tarko-Sale Тарко-Сале
- Town
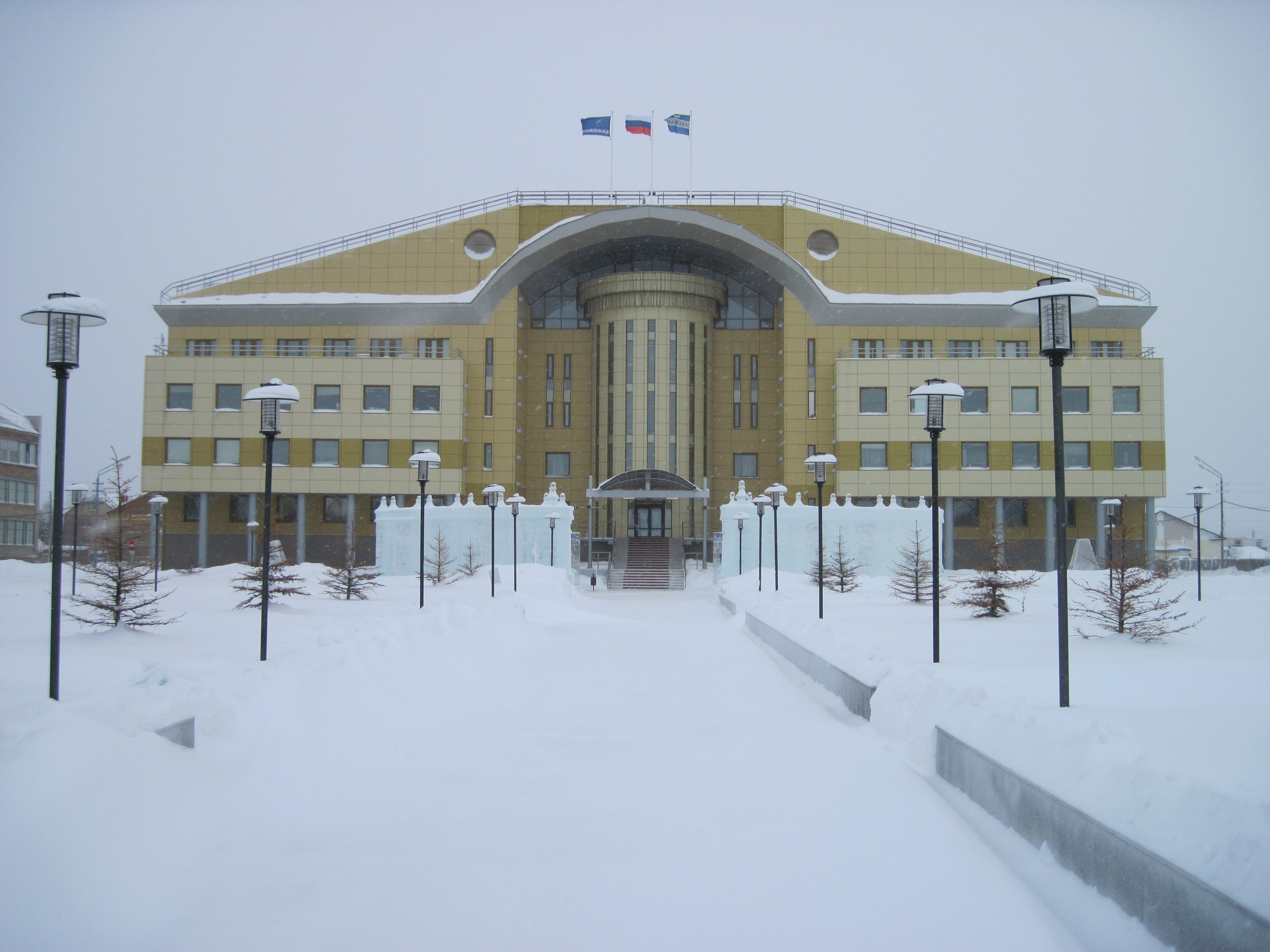
- Purovsky District Administration building in Tarko-Sale

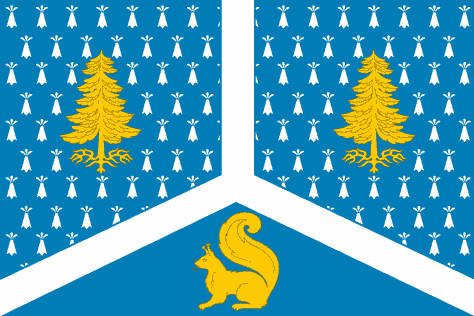
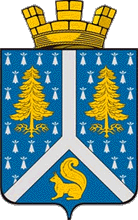
- Flag Coat of arms
- Interactive map of Tarko-Sale
- Location of Tarko-Sale Tarko-Sale (Yamalo-Nenets Autonomous Okrug)
- Coordinates: 64°55′N 77°48′E
- Country: Russia
- Federal subject: Yamalo-Nenets Autonomous Okrug
- Administrative district: Purovsky District
- Founded: 1932
- Town status since: March 23, 2004
- Elevation: 22 m (72 ft)

Population (2010 Census)
  - Total: 20,398
  - Estimate (2023): 19,932 (−2.3%)

Administrative status
  - Capital of: Purovsky District

Municipal status
  - Municipal district: Purovsky Municipal District
  - Urban settlement: Tarko-Sale Urban Settlement
  - Capital of: Purovsky Municipal District, Tarko-Sale Urban Settlement
- Time zone: UTC+5 (MSK+2)
- Postal codes: 629850, 629851
- OKTMO ID: 71940000001
- Website: www.tsgrad-adm.ru

Tarko-Sale (Russian: Та́рко-Сале́, Nenets: Тарка’ саля, Tarkaꜧ salja; Forest Nenets: Таӆка’ хаӆя) is a town and the administrative center of Purovsky District in Yamalo-Nenets Autonomous Okrug, Russia. It is located on the Pyakupur River near its confluence with the Ayvasedapur river, 560 kilometers (350 mi) southeast of Salekhard the administrative center of the autonomous okrug. The population of Tarko-Sale was 20,398 (2010 census); 18,517 (2002 census); 17,400 (1989 Soviet census).

== History ==
Tarko-Sale was founded in 1932, granted urban-type settlement status in 1976, and town status on March 23, 2004.

The Purovsky District Museum of History and Local Lore is located in Tarko-Sale. The museum houses over 26,990 items in its collection, including items related to natural history, ethnography, archeology, local history, and fine art.

== Geography and climate ==
Tarko-Sale is located near the Yamal and Gyda peninsulas, south of the Kara Sea. It lies just south of the Arctic Circle, in the Northern Temperate Zone. Like most of Russia, it has a subarctic climate (Köppen Dfc) characterized by long, cold winters and short, warm summers.

Climate data for Tarko-Sale (1980–2018)
Month	Jan	Feb	Mar	Apr	May	Jun	Jul	Aug	Sep	Oct	Nov	Dec	Year
Record high °C (°F)	1.6 (34.9)	3.4 (38.1)	6.8 (44.2)	15.1 (59.2)	30.0 (86.0)	33.4 (92.1)	34.5 (94.1)	31.6 (88.9)	26.3 (79.3)	17.5 (63.5)	3.9 (39.0)	1.7 (35.1)	34.5 (94.1)
Mean daily maximum °C (°F)	−20.0 (−4.0)	−17.9 (−0.2)	−9.0 (15.8)	−2.6 (27.3)	5.0 (41.0)	17.0 (62.6)	21.6 (70.9)	17.1 (62.8)	9.4 (48.9)	−0.8 (30.6)	−12.5 (9.5)	−17.0 (1.4)	−0.8 (30.6)
Daily mean °C (°F)	−24.2 (−11.6)	−22.3 (−8.1)	−14.2 (6.4)	−7.8 (18.0)	0.8 (33.4)	12.2 (54.0)	16.7 (62.1)	12.9 (55.2)	6.1 (43.0)	−3.6 (25.5)	−16.3 (2.7)	−21.3 (−6.3)	−5.1 (22.8)
Mean daily minimum °C (°F)	−28.4 (−19.1)	−26.8 (−16.2)	−19.4 (−2.9)	−13.0 (8.6)	−3.4 (25.9)	7.3 (45.1)	11.8 (53.2)	8.7 (47.7)	2.8 (37.0)	−6.4 (20.5)	−20.1 (−4.2)	−25.5 (−13.9)	−9.4 (15.1)
Record low °C (°F)	−54.2 (−65.6)	−49.5 (−57.1)	−46.5 (−51.7)	−41.1 (−42.0)	−25.5 (−13.9)	−7.8 (18.0)	1.8 (35.2)	−3.2 (26.2)	−7.9 (17.8)	−32.7 (−26.9)	−45.0 (−49.0)	−51.9 (−61.4)	−54.2 (−65.6)
Average precipitation mm (inches)	27.5 (1.08)	24.6 (0.97)	27.9 (1.10)	33.4 (1.31)	38.1 (1.50)	55.5 (2.19)	65.4 (2.57)	75.4 (2.97)	52.3 (2.06)	57.5 (2.26)	39.5 (1.56)	35.0 (1.38)	532.1 (20.95)
Source: Тарко-Сале погода

Nearby towns include Gubinsky, Muravlenko, and Urengoy, as well as the Kharampur, Khancheyskoye and Urengoy gas fields. The nearest city is Novy Urengoy.

== Administrative and municipal status ==
Within the framework of administrative divisions, Tarko-Sale serves as the administrative center of Purovsky District, to which it is directly subordinated. As a municipal division, the town of Tarko-Sale is incorporated within Purovsky Municipal District as Tarko-Sale Urban Settlement.

== Economy ==
Russia's largest independent gas producer, Novatek, is headquartered in Tarko-Sale. Oil and natural gas production is a key industry in the region, with an estimated 80% of Russia's natural gas and 15% of the world's natural gas supply stored in Yamalo-Nenets Autonomous Okrug.

Tarko-Sale also hosts a wood processing plant by Yamal LPK LLC (Ямальский лесопромышленный комплекс), which produces glued laminated timber and MHM panels.

The Tarko-Sale Airport was founded in 1962 and expanded greatly after the discovery of oil and natural gas deposits in the area in the 1970s. Its IATA code is TQL.

A 500kV substation is scheduled to be built in Tarko-Sale in 2021–2022.

== Gallery ==
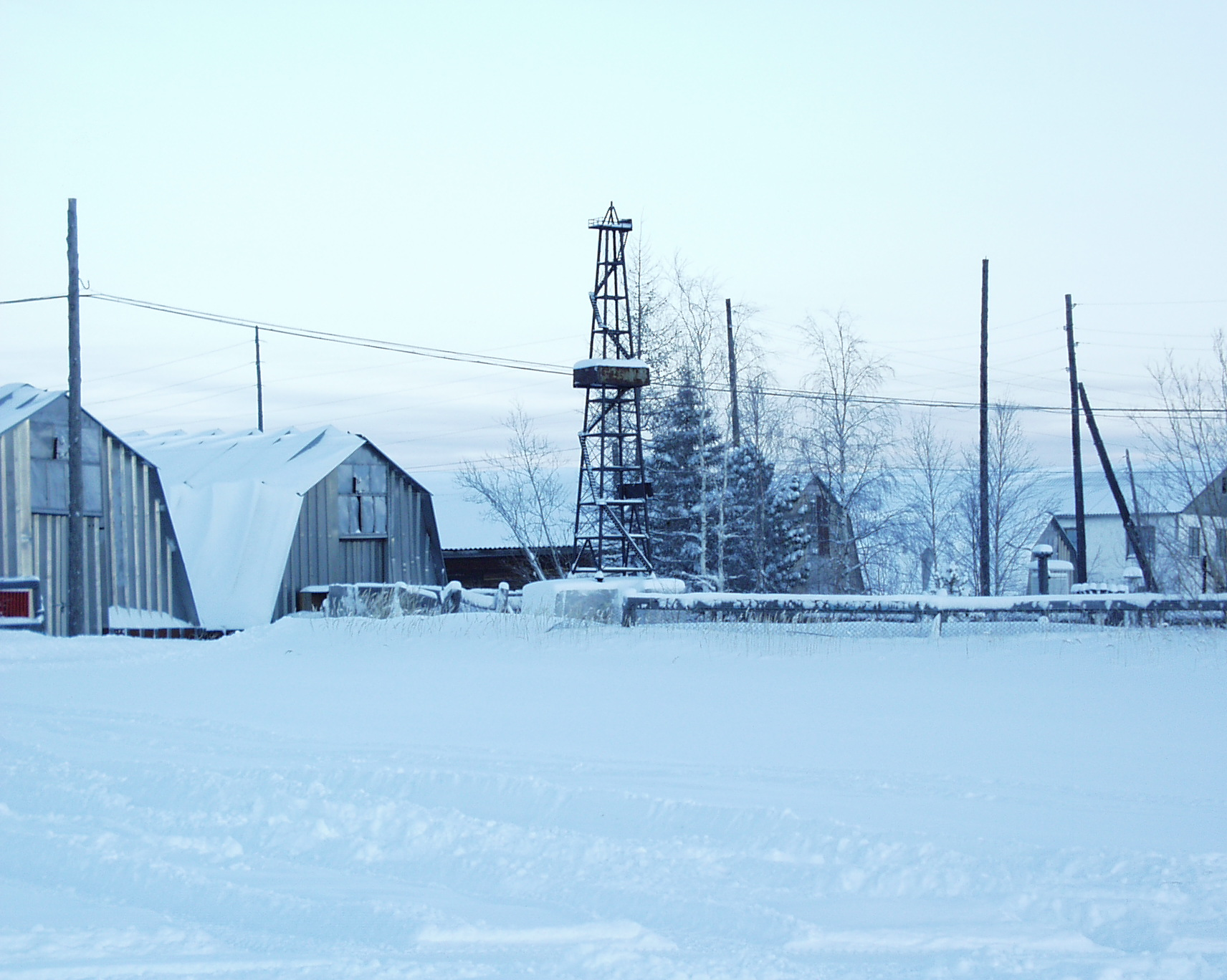
Monument dedicated to geologists in Tarko-Sale (2000)

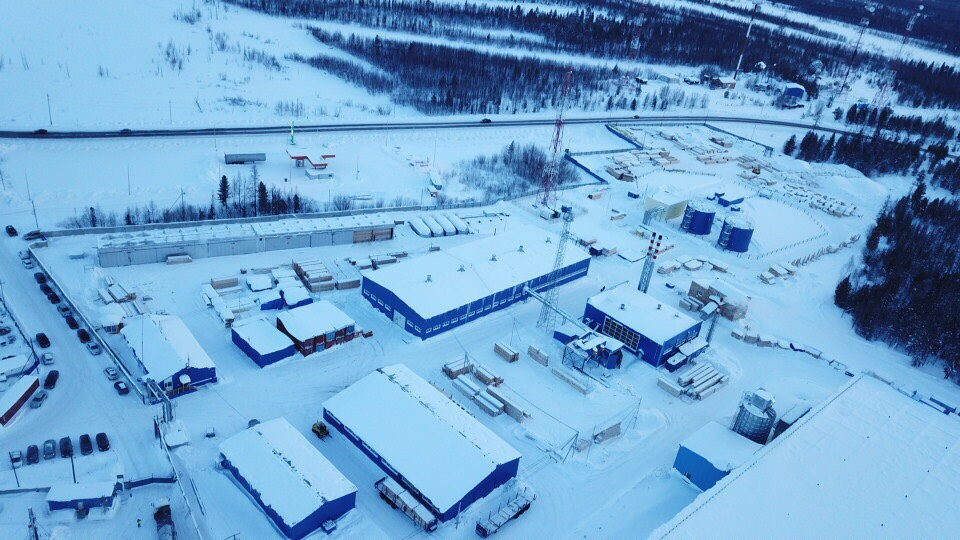
Aerial panorama of the YALPK wood processing plant (2019)

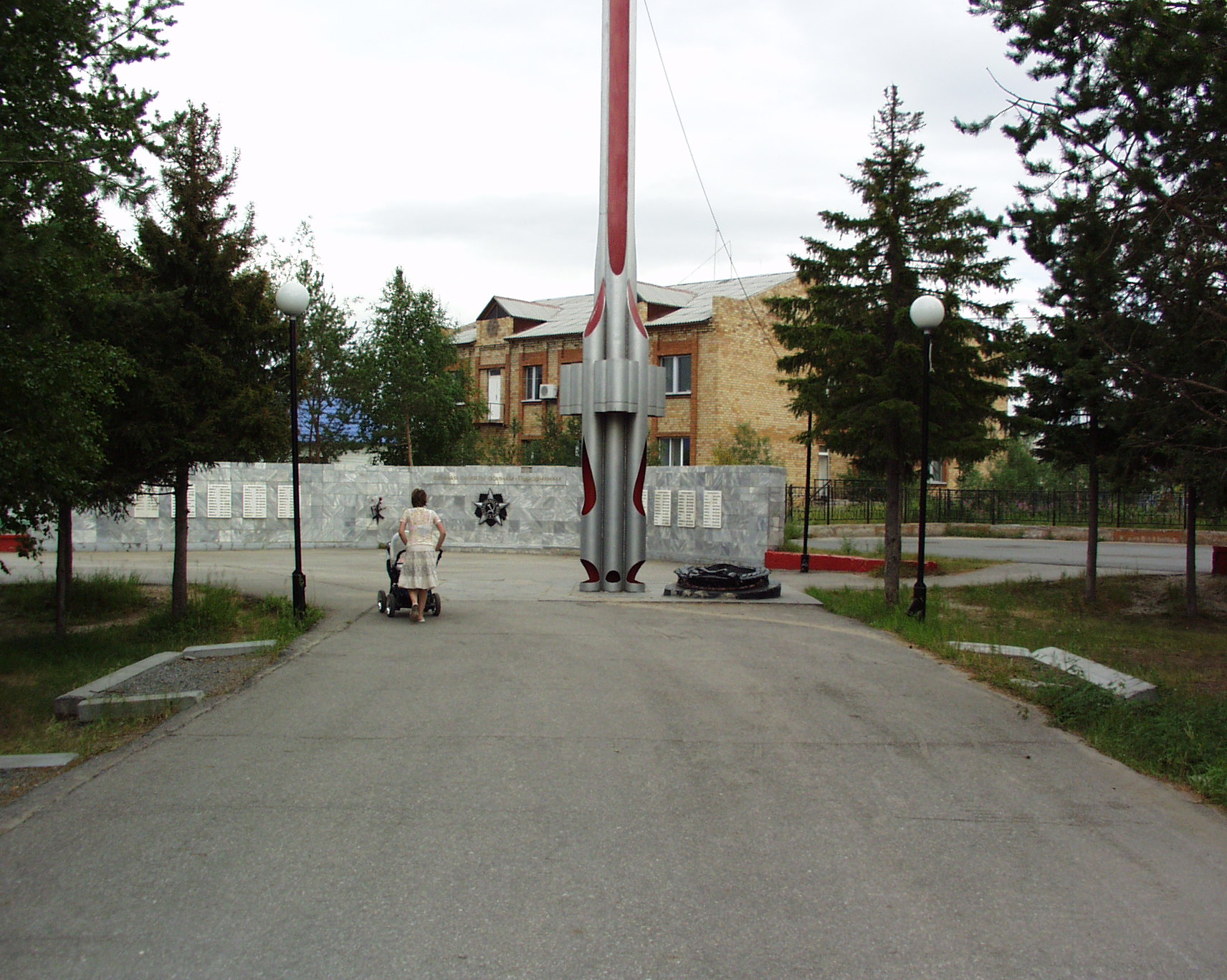
War memorial in Tarko-Sale (2007)

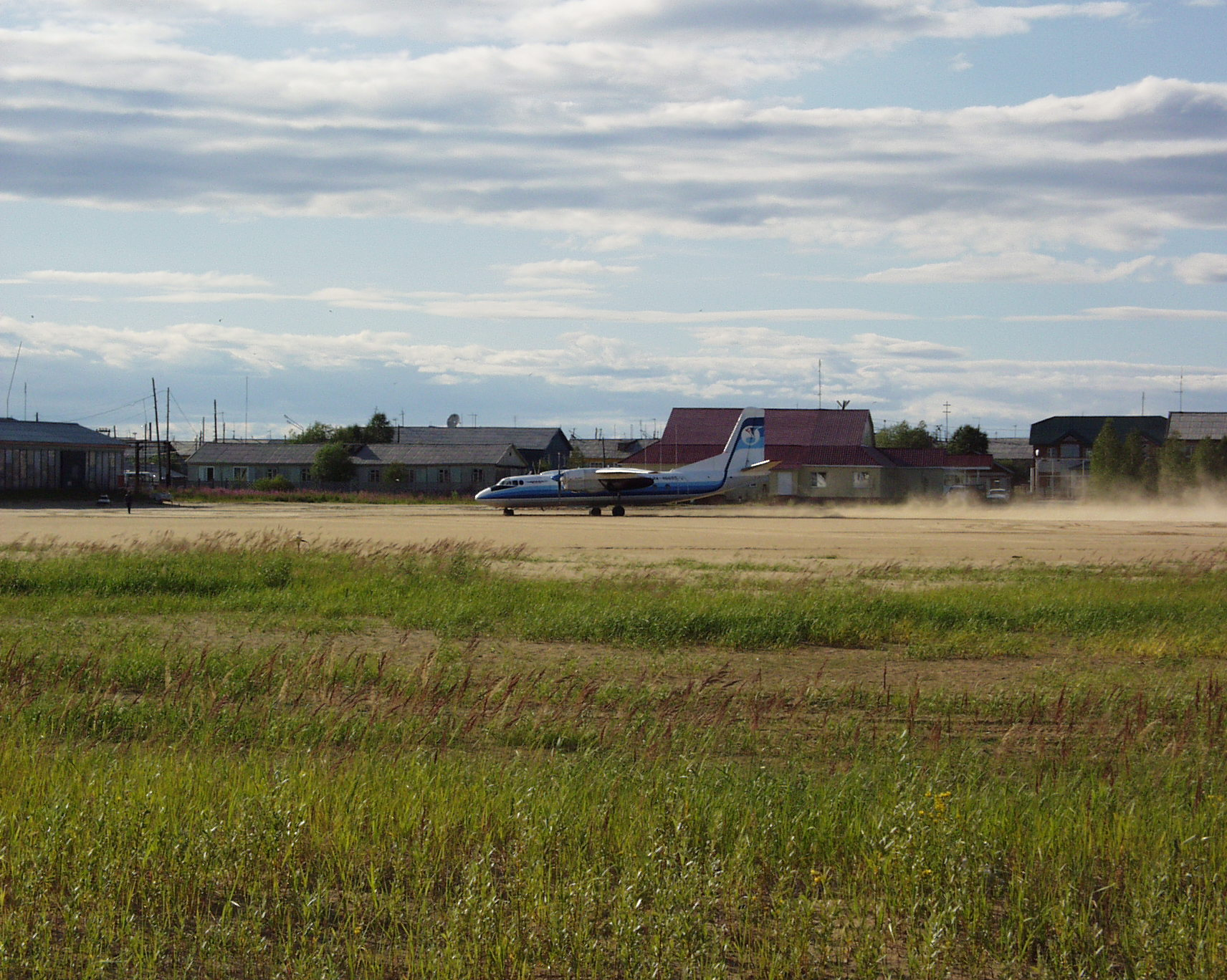
Airplane landing in Tarko-Sale (2007)

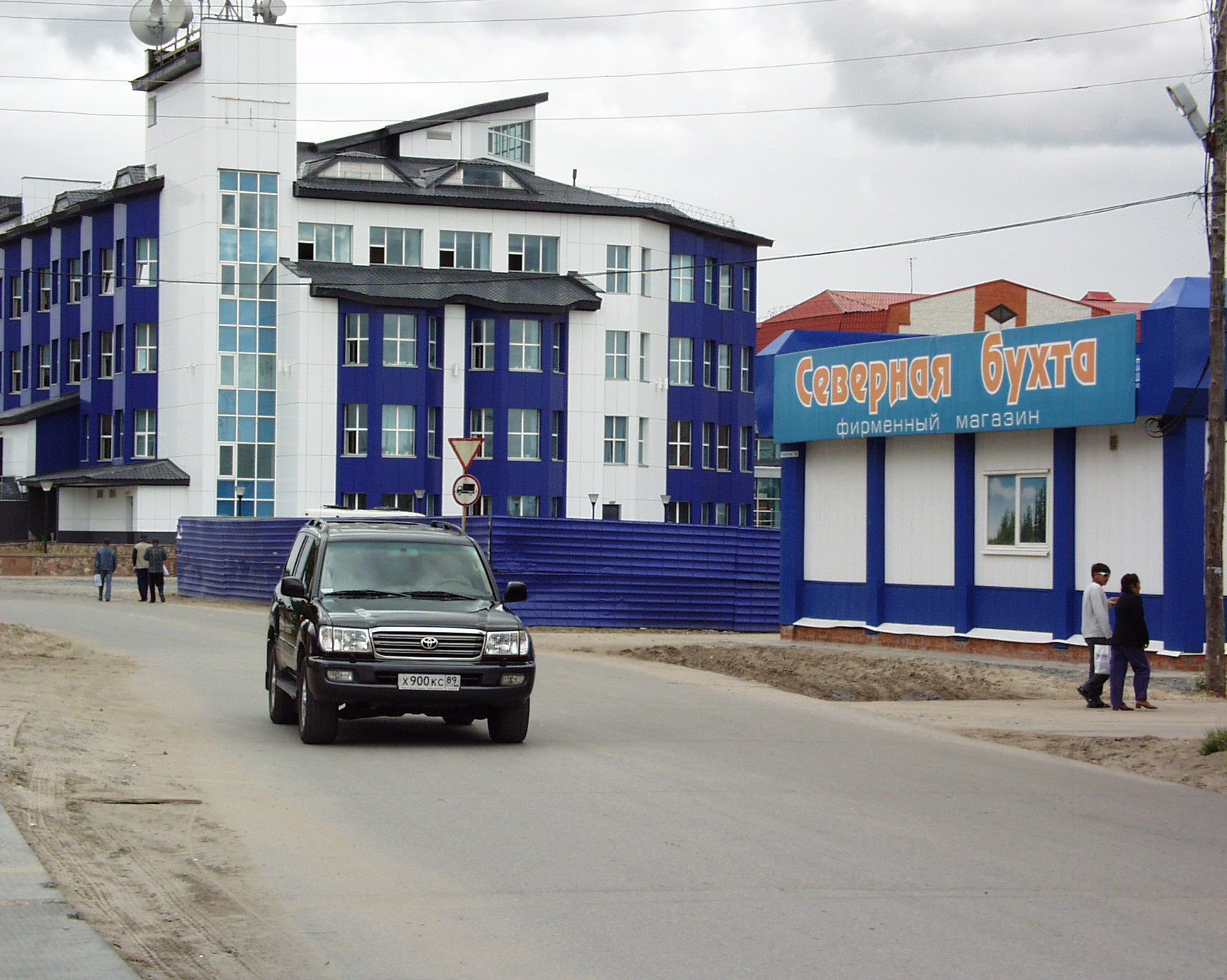
Shops on the north bay (2007)
