= Anthem of Nenets Autonomous Okrug =

Anthem of a Russian federal subject

Gimn Nenetskogo avtonomnogo okruga
English: Anthem of the Nenets Autonomous Okrug
- Гимн Ненецкого автономного округа
- Coat of arms of Nenets Autonomous Okrug
- Regional anthem of Nenets Autonomous Okrug
- Lyrics: Inga Arteyeva (Инга Артеева), 2002
- Music: Tatiana Artemjeva (Татьяна Артемьева)
- Adopted: 23 April 2008

Audio sample
- Official band and choral vocal recording: file; help

The Anthem of the Nenets Autonomous Okrug (Russian: Гимн Ненецкого автономного округа, romanized: Gimn Nenetskogo avtonomnogo okruga, Nenets: Гимн Ненэцие” автономной округхы) is the anthem of the Nenets Autonomous Okrug, a federal subject of Russia. It is one of the national symbols of the Nenets Autonomous Okrug along with its flag and coat of arms. It was written by Inga Arteyeva with music by Tatiana Artemyeva and it was officially adopted in 2008.

== Lyrics ==
Russian original

I
Поём тебя, Ненецкий округ,
Великой России опора!
Да здравствует край заполярный,
Родимые наши просторы!
Надежный форпост нерушимой
Единой Российской Державы,
Для Родины нашей любимой
Источник богатства и славы!

Припев:
Наш округ заполярный,
Родной, любимый край,
Тебе поём мы славу,
Живи и процветай!

II
Здесь издавна трудятся вместе
И ненец, и русский, и коми,
И всем есть достойное место
В приветливом северном доме.
Сердца в унисон наши бьются
Под светом полярных сияний:
На Севере люди — как братья,
Недаром они — северяне!

Припев

III
Здесь много и газа, и нефти,
Богато оленями стадо,
Полны свежей рыбою сети,
Другой нам Отчизны не надо!
Поём тебя, Ненецкий округ,
Великой России опора.
Да здравствует Север любимый —
Бескрайние тундры просторы.

Припев

Transliteration

I
Poyom tebya, Nenetskiy okrug,
Velikoy Rossii opora!
Da zdravstvuyet kray zapolyarnyy,
Rodimyye nashi prostory!
Nadezhnyy forpost nerushimoy
Yedinoy Rossiyskoy Derzhavy,
Dlya Rodiny nashey lyubimoy
Istochnik bogatstva i slavy!

Pripev:
Nash okrug zapolyarnyy,
Rodnoy, lyubimyy kray,
Tebe poyom my slavu,
Zhivi i protsvetay!

II
Zdes' izdavna trudyatsa vmeste
I nenets, i russkiy, i komi,
I vsem yest' dostoynoye mesto
V privetlivom severnom dome.
Serdtsa v unison nashi b'yutsa
Pod svetom polyarnykh siyaniy:
Na Severe lyudi — kak brat'ya,
Nedarom oni — severyane!

Pripev

III
Zdes' mnogo i gaza, i nefti,
Bogato olenyami stado,
Polny svezhey ryboyu seti,
Drugoy nam Otchizny ne nado!
Poyom tebya, Nenetskiy okrug,
Velikoy Rossii opora.
Da zdravstvuyet Sever lyubimyy —
Beskrayniye tundry prostory.

Pripev

Nenets translation

I
Ӈарка Россияна” енабцэй
Округӈэсь, сит хынтабива”!
Таӈгана мэбета яхана
Ӈэрмва” пилибт” илея!
Мэёвна перена форпоства”-
Российской Державана” сюдбя.
Мэнена сое”ма яна” ед
Сава илебцва” миӈая!

Припев:
Ӈэрм яхы маня” округвов”,
Сямянхат юнета ява,
Тисьдева саву”ламбадава”
Ӈоб” нерня” вадёдан”.

II
Ненэцял, луцарэй, ӈызмарэй ӈод”
Ӈахэт ивъерэй манзара”.
Ӈобкана мэта Ӈэрм хардаханов
Хусувэна” мэта яда таняӈов.
Ялумбэй Ӈэрм харпорма серэй
Сейкуна’’ мал’ ӈобнзер” ла”нарӈа’’.
Ӈэрм яхяна хибярир нятнарха,
Ӈадьбята малмбоё ӈэрмдерараха”.

Припев

III
Тюкона я’ инд”,я’ тебтар ӈока.
Выӈгы тэрэй ӈобтарем’ ӈоков.
Халя нямзэхэ”, поӈган’ еремга.
Ӈани тэнз я нянана” ни тара”!
Россияна” енабцӈэ мэтаӈэсь,
Ненэця округ, сит хынотамбивов.
Сюдбя Россияна” енабцӈэсь,
Мэнена Ӈэрмва” тяха” мирнаёв.

Припев

Transliteration
I

Ňarka Rossijana” jenabcei

Okrugňeś, sit hyntabiva”!

Taňgana mebieta jahana

Ňermua” pilibt” ilieja!

Mejouna pieriena forpostua” –

Rossijskoi Dieržavana” siudbia.

Meniena soje”ma jana” jed

Sava iliebcua” miňaja!

Pripev:

Ňerm jahy mania” okruguou”,

Siamianhat junieta java,

Tiśdieva savu”lambadava”

Ňob” niernia” vadiodan”.

II

Nienecial, lucarei, ňyzmarei ňod”

Ňahet ivjerei manzara”.

Ňobkana meta Ňerm hardahanou

Husuvena” meta jada taniaňou.

Jalumbei Ňerm harporma sierei

Sieikuna” mal’ ňobnzier” la”narňa”.

Ňerm jahiana hibiarir niatnarha,

Ňaďbiata malmbojo ňermdieraraha”.

Pripev

Tiukona ja’ ind”, ja’ tiebtar ňoka.

Vyňgy terei ňobtariem’ ňokou.

Halia niamzehe”, poňgan’ jeriemga.

Ňani tenz ja nianana” ni tara”!

Rossijana” jenabcňe metaňeś,

Nienecia okrug, sit hynotambivou.

Siudbia Rossijana” jenabcňeś,

Meniena Ňermua” tiaha” mirnajeu.

Pripev

English translation

I
We sing thee, Nenets okrug,
With support by the great Russia!
Long live the polar region,
The birthmarks of our open spaces!
A reliable outpost that is unbreakable
United with Russian Power,
For our beloved Motherland
The source of wealth and glory!

Chorus:
Our polar okrug,
Native, beloved land,
Thee we sing with glory,
Live and prosper!

II
As long since working together here,
And Nenets, and Russians, and Komi,
And everyone has a decent place
In the welcoming northern home.
With our hearts beating in unison
Under the polar auroras:
In the North, people — as brothers,
No wonder they are — northerners!

Chorus

III
There is an abundance of gas and oil,
A richly deer herd,
A network full of fresh fish,
We do not need another homeland!
We sing thee, Nenets okrug,
With support by the great Russia!
Hail to our favorite Northern land —
Of boundless expanses of the tundra.

Chorus
