= Sergey Korepanov =

Sergey Korepanov may refer to:

- Sergey Korepanov (racewalker) (born 1964), Kazakhstani race walker
- Sergey Korepanov (politician) (1948–2022), Russian politician
