= Pyakuto =

Lake in Yamalo-Nenets Autonomous Okrug, Russia

- Пякуто
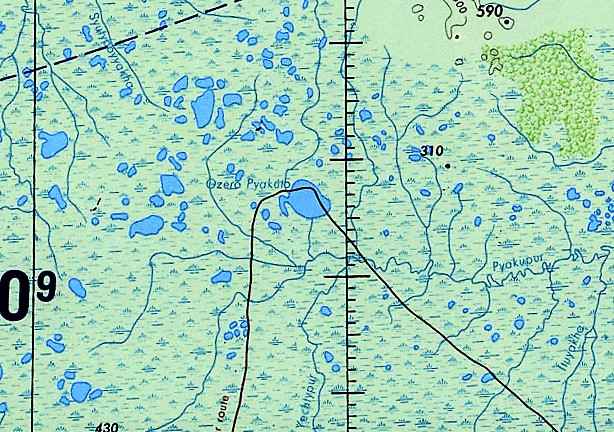
- Pyakuto lake ONC map section.

- Location in the Yamalo-Nenets Autonomous Okrug, Russia
- Location: Purovsky District
- Coordinates: 63°36′N 73°52′E
- Lake type: Thaw lake
- Primary inflows: Pyamaliakha
- Primary outflows: Prungtoyagun
- Catchment area: 278 square kilometres (107 mi^{2})
- Basin countries: Russia
- Max. length: 8.5 kilometres (5.3 mi)
- Max. width: 5.5 kilometres (3.4 mi)
- Surface area: 32.9 square kilometres (12.7 mi^{2})
- Average depth: 380 metres (1,250 ft)
- Max. depth: 13.5 metres (44 ft)
- Surface elevation: 90.2 metres (296 ft)
- Islands: None

Pyakuto (Russian: Пякуто) is a freshwater lake in Yamalo-Nenets Autonomous Okrug, Russia. The name of the lake originated in the Forest Nenets language.

The lake lies below the Arctic Circle in an area of permafrost. Its shores are low and swampy. There is a winter road passing across the lake.

== Geography ==
Pyakuto is a lake of thermokarst origin having a roughly round shape with a deep indentation in the western shore. The lake is located in the Purovsky District, at the southern end of the Yamalo-Nenets Autonomous Okrug, 30 kilometres (19 mi) to the southwest of Muravlenko. The 62 kilometres (39 mi) long Pyamaliakha flows into the lake and the 15 kilometres (9.3 mi) long Prungtoyagun flows out of it.

== Flora and fauna ==
On the eastern shore there is tundra moss vegetation and on the northern coniferous forest. Among the fish species found in the lake, peled and humpback whitefish deserve mention.

== See also ==
- List of lakes of Russia
