= Noyabrsk =

Noyabrsk Ноябрьск
- City
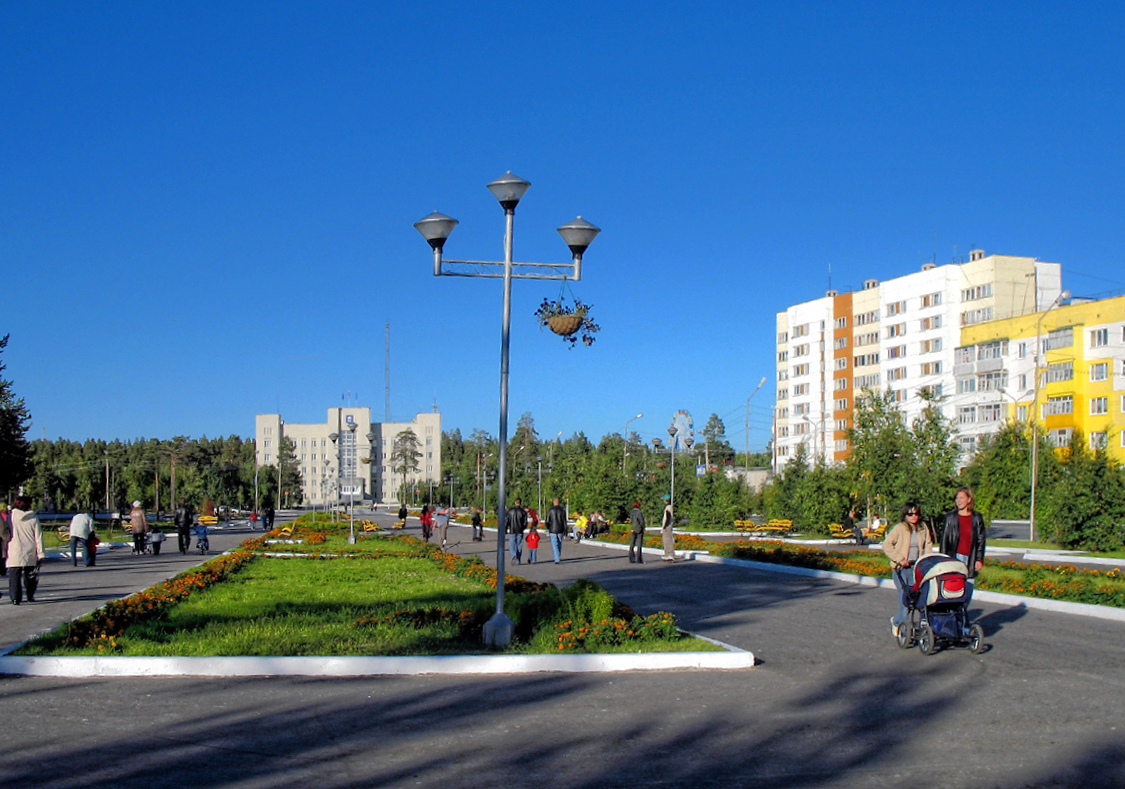
- Noyabrsk city center

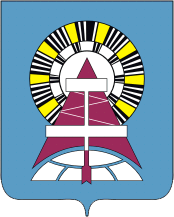
- Flag Coat of arms
- Interactive map of Noyabrsk
- Location of Noyabrsk Noyabrsk (Yamalo-Nenets Autonomous Okrug)
- Coordinates: 63°12′N 75°27′E
- Country: Russia
- Federal subject: Yamalo-Nenets Autonomous Okrug
- Founded: October 26, 1977
- City status since: April 28, 1982

Government
  - Body: City Duma
  - Head: Alexey Romanov
- Elevation: 115 m (377 ft)

Population (2010 Census)
  - Total: 110,620
  - Estimate (1 January 2024): 102,938 (−6.9%)
  - Rank: 144th in 2010

Administrative status
  - Subordinated to: city of okrug significance of Noyabrsk
  - Capital of: city of okrug significance of Noyabrsk

Municipal status
  - Urban okrug: Noyabrsk Urban Okrug
  - Capital of: Noyabrsk Urban Okrug
- Time zone: UTC+5 (MSK+2)
- Postal code: 629811
- Dialing code: +7 3496
- OKTMO ID: 71958000001
- City Day: First Sunday of September
- Website: [ admnoyabrsk.ru/%20admnoyabrsk.ru]]

Noyabrsk (Russian: Ноя́брьск, IPA: [nɐˈjabrʲsk]; Tundra Nenets: Нюдя Пэвдей марˮ, romanized: Njudja Pəvdej marꜧ; Forest Nenets: Нюча пэ”дя”й марˮ, romanized: Njuča pəꜧdjaꜧj marꜧ) is the second largest city in Yamalo-Nenets Autonomous Okrug, Russia, located in the middle of the West Siberian oil fields, on the Tyumen–Novy Urengoy railway about 300 kilometers (190 mi) north of Surgut. Population: 110,620 (2010 census).

== History ==
The city history dates back to 1975 when a landing party arriving by helicopter disembarked on the ice of the Itu-Yakha River to start developing Kholmogorskoye oil field. In November 1976, the first party of railway builders arrived at the site of the future city and camped out by Lake Khanto with the task of creating a settlement. On October 26, 1977, the settlement of Noyabrsk, which grew around the railway station of Noyabrskaya, was officially registered. It was decided to choose the name of "Noyabrsk" instead of the other proposal, "Khanto", to perpetuate the memory of the first arrival in November 1976, as the Russian word for November is "ноябрь" (noyabr). The settlement was granted work settlement status on November 12, 1979 and that of a town on April 28, 1982.

== Administrative and municipal status ==
Within the framework of administrative divisions, it is incorporated as the city of okrug significance of Noyabrsk—an administrative unit with the status equal to that of the districts. As a municipal division, the city of okrug significance of Noyabrsk is incorporated as Noyabrsk Urban Okrug.

== Demographics ==
Population changes
Year	1982	1986	1989	1996	2002	2004	2006	2010	2021
Population	25,100	68,000	85,880	95,500	96,440	98,400	108,500	110,620	100,188

- Graph of population growth:

The average age of the population is just over 30.

== Economy ==
The economy of Noyabrsk is based on hydrocarbons production. Noyabrsk is the base of operations for two major companies. Gazpromneft–Noyabrskneftegaz is a major oil producing subsidiary of Gazprom Neft. It is the largest oil company in Yamalo-Nenets Autonomous Okrug and accounts for 6% of Russia's total oil production. In the natural gas sector, Gazprom dobycha Noyabrsk—one of the three leading Gazprom subsidiaries—has an annual production of 85 billion cubic meters. This corresponds to 9.3% of Gazprom's total yearly gas production. It operates several gas fields around the city. To the northeast: the Vyngapurovskoye (launched in 1978) and Vyngayakhinskoye (launched in 2006) fields; and to the northwest: the Komsomolskoye (launched in 1993) and Zapadno-Tarkosalinskoye (launched in 1996) fields. The main business advantage of Gazprom dobycha Noyabrsk is the low prime cost of production. The company also provides operator services in gas and consensation production and gas treatment. In addition, there are over 1,000 companies providing services for the oil and gas industry and support for the social infrastructure of the city.

=== Transportation ===
The Noyabrsk Airport is located approximately 6 kilometers (3.7 mi) to the west of the city. It is a modern airport capable of landing large aircraft. There are flights most days to Moscow (Domodedovo or Vnukovo Airports), several times a week to Salekhard, and to a variety of other locations. The town is divided into a smaller southern part, Noyabrsk-I, and a larger northern part, Noyabrsk-II, each having its own train station. which has caught novice travellers out in the past. The railway line separates the residential part of the town from the industrial sites that service the oil fields.

== Media and communication ==
The oldest local newspaper is "Severnaya Vakhta" (Russian: Се́верная Ва́хта, "Northern Watch"). Its first issue came out in January 1983. As of 2007, the paper is printed thrice a week and is distributed not only in the town but also in the neighbouring settlements - Hanymey, Vingapurovskiy, Muravlenko, Kholmy. There is also a local newspaper called Region 57 after the registration plate code for cars from the area, and a newspaper Slovo Neftyanika (Russian: Сло́во Нефтя́ника, "The word of the Oil-Worker"). The town has its radio stations, such as Radio Noyabrsk, a TV channel Mig (Russian: Миг, a moment), a Tele-express studio.

== Education ==
The first school in Noyabrsk opened in 1977, barely a year after the beginning of the settlement. Now Noyabrsk has 14 schools, a pedagogical college, an evening school, a children's art and a children's musical schools and driving schools. Providing higher education services to the population are 8 branches and 4 affiliated schools of higher education establishments of Tyumen, Tomsk and other cities of Russia.

== Recreation, sports, sights ==
Noyabrsk boasts numerous sport facilities, including artificial ice rink and a number of open-air rinks in the winter, cross-country skiing tracks, several indoor swimming pools, a number of gyms and indoor playing fields used for football, basketball, volleyball, lawn-tennis, ping-pong, martial arts training, boxing.

The motocross track of Noyabrsk presents an arena for the annual Yamal motocross cup championship; one of stages of Russian motocross championship is also conducted here.

Recreation for the visiting oil worker or resident also includes a movie theater, shopping centers, bars.

During summer, Lake Khanto 2 kilometres (1.2 mi) north of the town is popular for walking and barbecues. A little further from the town are other popular lakes, Svetloye and Szemchuzhnoye.

In the summer and during early autumn the forests and marshes attract many people for hiking, camping and gathering berries and mushrooms.

In winter, there is a cross-country ski-club to the immediate west of the residential districts. Winter also normally has an "Ice Palace" constructed for some weeks in the town center's park, beside the city administrative offices.

There is a park with a Ferris wheel in the center of the town.

There is a Great Patriotic War memorial in the town, with the traditional eternal flame.

The Museum Resource Center of Noyabrsk comprises three departments: arts museum, town history museum, and the museum of children's art. It boasts a rich ethnographical collection and provides place for diverse thematical expositions. In 2007 the center was awarded Grand Prix at the annual Yamal Museum Projects festival.

Two religious landmarks of the town are the Russian Orthodox Archangel Michael Church, which stands on a hill surrounded by trees, and a mosque.

== Crime ==
Noyabrsk was a very young and partially closed town during the Soviet era, with a predominantly professional working population, which provided some protection from external criminal influence. With its opening in the early 1990s and with oil and gas industry maintaining relatively high living standards in the economic turmoil of post-Soviet Russia, the illicit drug business became highly profitable, drawing criminal elements from other regions. The situation was compounded by the police and officials being corrupted and ill-equipped to tackle the problem and by the general lack of work for teenagers. The drug abuse situation in Noyabrsk was covered on national TV and in other media and finally official and citizen organisations arose to fight the problem.

On March 17, 2009, a criminal case against the mayor Nikolay Korobkov was sent to court. According to the prosecution, he transferred some municipal property to a private company when he didn't have the power to do so.

== Twin towns and sister cities ==
Noyabrsk is twinned with:

- Korosten, Ukraine (1999)
