= Khor Lambey =

Vexillological symbol

Flag of Nenets Autonomous Okrug

Flag of Yamalo-Nenets Autonomous Okrug

The Khor Lambey is a pattern found on the flags of Nenets Autonomous Okrug and Yamalo-Nenets Autonomous Okrug.

The nominative definition of this mosaic pattern in the Nenets language correlates with reindeer herding.
