= Gubkinsky =

Gubkinsky (masculine), Gubkinskaya (feminine), or Gubkinskoye (neuter) may refer to:

- Gubkinsky District, a district of Belgorod Oblast, Russia
- Gubkinsky Urban Okrug, name of several urban okrugs in Russia
- Gubkinsky (town), a town in Yamalo-Nenets Autonomous Okrug, Russia
