= Novy Port =

Novy Port Новый Порт
- Rural locality
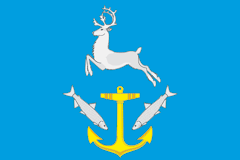
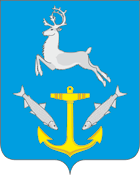
- Flag Coat of arms
- Interactive map of Novy Port
- Location of Novy Port Novy Port (Yamalo-Nenets Autonomous Okrug)
- Coordinates: 67°41′31″N 72°53′47″E
- Country: Russia
- Federal subject: Yamalo-Nenets Autonomous Okrug
- Founded: 1942

Population
  - Estimate (2019): 1,820 )
- Time zone: UTC+5 (MSK+2)
- Postal code: 629712
- OKTMO ID: 71928414101

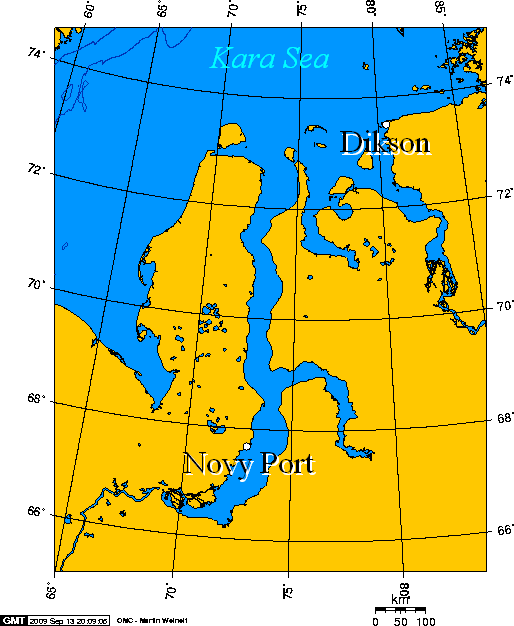
Novy Port and Dikson -- Russian Arctic ports on the Kara Sea.

Novy Port (Russian: Но́вый Порт, lit. New Port) is a settlement in Yamalo-Nenets Autonomous Okrug, Russia, located on the mouth of the Ob River (Gulf of Ob). Population: 1,797.

Along with Dikson, it is the main port on the Kara Sea. Its main industry is a fish factory.

In the 1930s, Novy Port was an interim coal bunkering port for providing power to vessels traversing the Northern Sea Route.

The Northern Sea Route is so long that the Soviets tried to power each leg of the voyage by locally mined coal. The coal bunkered at Novy Port was, at that time, mined from other Soviet Arctic ports.

== Climate ==
Novy Port has a severe subarctic climate (Köppen climate classification Dfc). The weather (even in the warmest month, July) is notoriously unpleasant. Winter lasts eight months, and precipitation is low throughout a year.

Climate data for Novy Port
Month	Jan	Feb	Mar	Apr	May	Jun	Jul	Aug	Sep	Oct	Nov	Dec	Year
Record high °C (°F)	0.6 (33.1)	1.4 (34.5)	7.1 (44.8)	6.1 (43.0)	17.6 (63.7)	29.7 (85.5)	32.8 (91.0)	30.1 (86.2)	22.5 (72.5)	13.7 (56.7)	3.6 (38.5)	0.7 (33.3)	32.8 (91.0)
Mean daily maximum °C (°F)	−21.1 (−6.0)	−20.6 (−5.1)	−15.6 (3.9)	−9.4 (15.1)	−1.7 (28.9)	10.6 (51.1)	17.2 (63.0)	14.1 (57.4)	8.2 (46.8)	−3.9 (25.0)	−12.8 (9.0)	−17.2 (1.0)	−4.4 (24.2)
Daily mean °C (°F)	−23.9 (−11.0)	−23.9 (−11.0)	−18.3 (−0.9)	−12.8 (9.0)	−4.4 (24.1)	6.2 (43.2)	13.0 (55.4)	10.6 (51.1)	5.3 (41.5)	−6.1 (21.0)	−15.6 (3.9)	−19.4 (−2.9)	−7.4 (18.6)
Mean daily minimum °C (°F)	−27.8 (−18.0)	−27.8 (−18.0)	−22.8 (−9.0)	−17.2 (1.0)	−6.7 (19.9)	2.8 (37.0)	8.7 (47.7)	6.9 (44.4)	2.4 (36.3)	−8.3 (17.1)	−18.3 (−0.9)	−23.9 (−11.0)	−11.0 (12.2)
Record low °C (°F)	−50.9 (−59.6)	−49.4 (−56.9)	−48.1 (−54.6)	−39.9 (−39.8)	−29.2 (−20.6)	−13.3 (8.1)	−0.9 (30.4)	−4 (25)	−14.7 (5.5)	−30.3 (−22.5)	−40.3 (−40.5)	−47.7 (−53.9)	−50.9 (−59.6)
Average precipitation mm (inches)	24.8 (0.98)	19.1 (0.75)	22.2 (0.87)	23.0 (0.91)	26.3 (1.04)	31.7 (1.25)	35.6 (1.40)	47.7 (1.88)	37.5 (1.48)	36.7 (1.44)	25.6 (1.01)	27.2 (1.07)	357.4 (14.07)
Source: climatebase.ru
