= Flag of Nenets Autonomous Okrug =

Flag of the Russian autonomous okrug of Nenets

Nenets Autonomous Okrug
- Proportion: 2:3
- Adopted: 25 September 2003
- Design: A white field charged with green stripe and a blue ornament strand.

The flag of the Nenets Autonomous Okrug, in the Russian Federation, is a white field charged with green stripe and a blue ornament strand (a Khor Lambey, seen also on the flag of Yamalo-Nenets Autonomous Okrug) near the bottom. A blue stripe separates the bottom most green stripe from the ornament.

The flag was adopted as the winning design of a competition on 25 September 2003. The proportions are 2:3.

The blue crown design on the flag is also seen on the flag of the Yamalo-Nenets Autonomous Okrug.

== Other flags ==
=== Administrative divisions ===
Flag	Date	Use	Description	Ref.
	31 May 2001–present	Flag of Naryan-Mar		
	29 May 2008–present	Flag of Zapolyarny District		

=== Settlements ===
Flag	Date	Use	Description	Ref.
	6 December 2016–present	Flag of Amderma		
	10 April 2013–present	Flag of Andeg		
	16 April 2012–present	Flag of Velikovisochnoye		
	February 2, 2010–present	Flag of Kaninsky Village Council		
	16 October 2009–present	Flag of Karsky village council		
	29 August 2013–present	Flag of Bugrino		
	August 31, 2015–present	Flag of Kotkinsky village council		
	2 March 2011–present	Flag of Malozemelsky village council		
	3 September 2010–present	Flag of Omsk village council		
	30 November 2009–present	Flag of Omsk village council		
	26 May 2010–present	Flag of Primorsko-Kuysky village council		
	28 June 2006–present	Flag of Pustozersky village council		
	23 December 2004–present	Flag of the Telvisochny village council		
	28 December 2009–present	Flag of the Timansky Village Council		
	14 October 2009–present	Flag of the Khorey-Versky village council		
	16 November 2009–present	Flag of Khoseda-Khardsky		
	27 May 2010–present	Flag of the Shoinsky village council		
	30 September 2009–present	Flag of Yusharsky village council		
	26 June 2012–present	Flag of Iskateley		
