= List of chairmen of the Legislative Assembly of Yamalo-Nenets Autonomous Okrug =

The chairman of the Legislative Assembly of Yamalo-Nenets Autonomous Okrug is the presiding officer of that legislature.

== Chairmen ==
Name	Took office	Left office
Nikolay Babin	1994	1996
Sergey Korepanov	1996	1998
Andrey Artyukhov	1998	2000
Alexey Arteev	2000	2000
Sergey Kharyuchi	2000	Present

== Sources ==
- The Legislative Assembly of Yamalo-Nenets
