= Kharampur gas field =

Natural gas field in Yamalo-Nenets Autonomous Okrug, Russia

Kharampur
- Country: Russia
- Region: Yamalo-Nenets Autonomous Okrug
- Offshore/onshore: onshore
- Operator: Gazprom

Field history
- Discovery: 1966
- Start of production: 1972

Production
- Current production of gas: 7.1×10^{6} m^{3}/d 250×10^{6} cu ft/d
- Estimated gas in place: 526×10^{9} m^{3} 18.4×10^{12} cu ft

The Kharampur gas field is a natural gas field located in the Purovsky District of Yamalo-Nenets Autonomous Okrug in western Siberia, Russia. Discovered in 1979, the field was developed from 1990, with production subsequently expanded to the southern part and the adjacent Festivalnoye area. Rosneft developed the field's gas resources through its Kharampurneftegaz subsidiary, focusing on the Cenomanian and Turonian reservoirs. The field has reported 3P gas reserves of approximately 739 billion cubic metres (bcm), with first-stage production planned at around 11 bcm per year Gas production began in September 2022, and approximately 4.7 bcm was produced during that year.
