= Pechorsky Uyezd =

Pechorsky Uyezd (Печорский уезд) was one of the subdivisions of the Arkhangelsk Governorate of the Russian Empire. It was situated in the eastern part of the governorate. Its administrative centre was Ust-Tsilma.

== Demographics ==
At the time of the Russian Empire Census of 1897, Pechorsky Uyezd had a population of 34,992. Of these, 62.8% spoke Komi-Zyrian, 29.2% Russian and 7.9% Nenets as their native language.
