= Khancheyskoye gas field =

Gas field in Yamalo-Nenets Autonomous Okrug, Russia

Khancheyskoye
- Country: Russia
- Region: Yamalo-Nenets Autonomous Okrug
- Offshore/onshore: onshore
- Operator: Novatek

Field history
- Discovery: 1990
- Start of development: 1990
- Start of production: 2001

Production
- Current production of gas: 9.8×10^{6} m^{3}/d 347.7×10^{6} cu ft/d
- Estimated oil in place: 3.3 million tonnes (~ 3.91×10^{6} m^{3} or 24.6 million bbl)
- Estimated gas in place: 32.6×10^{9} m^{3} 1.151×10^{12} cu ft

The Khancheyskoye gas field is a natural gas field located in the Yamalo-Nenets Autonomous Okrug. It was discovered in 1990 and developed by and Novatek. It began production in 2001 and produces natural gas and condensates. The total proven reserves of the Khancheyskoye gas field are around 1.151 trillion cubic feet (32.6 billion m³), and production is slated to be around 347.7 million cubic feet/day (9.8×10^{5}m³) in 2010.
