= Pangody =

Pangody Пангоды
- Urban-type settlement
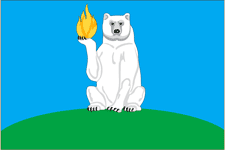
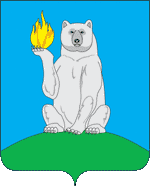
- Flag Coat of arms
- Interactive map of Pangody
- Location of Pangody Pangody (Yamalo-Nenets Autonomous Okrug)
- Coordinates: 65.8564°N 74.4927°E
- Country: Russia
- Federal subject: Yamalo-Nenets Autonomous Okrug
- Administrative district: Nadymsky District

Population (2010 Census)
  - Total: 10,805
  - Estimate (2021): 11,132 (+3%)
- Time zone: UTC+5 (MSK+2)
- Postal code: 629757
- OKTMO ID: 71916156051

Pangody (Russian: Пангоды) is an urban locality (an urban-type settlement) in Nadymsky District of Yamalo-Nenets Autonomous Okrug, Russia. Population: 10,805 (2010 census); 10,868 (2002 census); 12,635 (1989 Soviet census).
