= Sergey Korepanov (politician) =

Russian politician (1948–2022)

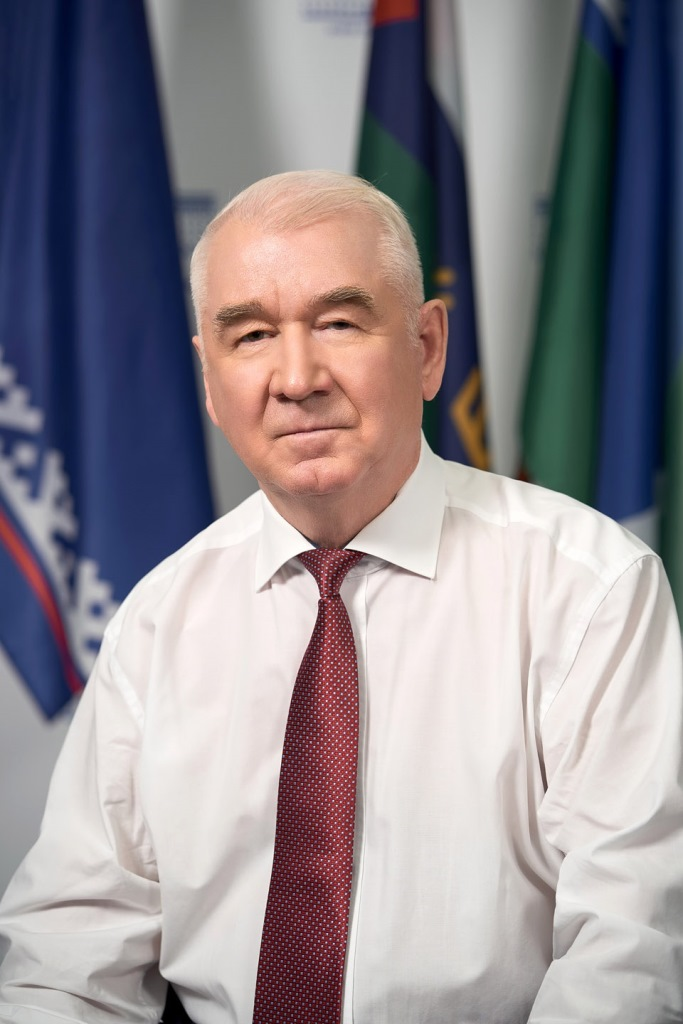
- Korepanov in 2020

Chairman of the Tyumen Oblast Duma
- In office 16 January 1998 – 28 June 2022
- Preceded by: Nikolai Baryshnikov
- Succeeded by: Andrey Artyukhov (acting)

Chairman of the State Duma of Yamalo-Nenets Autonomous Okrug
- In office 15 May 1996 – 23 January 1998
- Preceded by: Nikolay Babin
- Succeeded by: Andrey Artyukhov

First Secretary of the Yamalo-Nenets District Committee of the CPSU
- In office October 1989 – August 1991
- Preceded by: Valery Pervushin
- Succeeded by: position abolished

Personal details
- Born: Sergey Yevgenyevich Korepanov; 6 January 1948 Naryan-Mar, Nenets Autonomous Okrug, Arkhangelsk Oblast, Russian SFSR, Soviet Union
- Died: 28 June 2022 (aged 74) Tyumen, Russia
- Party: CPSU (until 1991); United Russia
- Education: Riga Aeronautical Institute; National Aviation University; Urals Institute of Management; Russian Academy of State Service

Sergey Yevgenyevich Korepanov (Russian: Серге́й Евге́ньевич Корепа́нов; 6 January 1948 – 28 June 2022) was a Russian politician. A member of United Russia, he served as chairman of the Tyumen Oblast Duma from 1998 to 2022.

Korepanov died in Tyumen on 28 June 2022 at the age of 74.

== Biography ==
Korepanov was born on 6 January 1948 in Naryan-Mar, which was then part of the Russian SFSR. His father was a fisherman and his mother was a milkmaid. He first graduated from the Riga Aeronautical Institute in 1969, whereupon he entered the Salekhard United Air Squadron as a radio technician until 1973. In 1973, he became an instructor and head of the department of the Yamalo-Nenets committee, which he did until 1979. While working, in 1976, he graduated from the Kiev Institute of Civil Aviation Engineers with a degree in radio engineering and was a Candidate of Sciences.

In 1987, he graduated from the Sverdlovsk Higher Party School. During the following years, he worked in the Komsomol and became the last First Secretary of the Yamalo-Nenets District Committee until 1990. After the collapse of the Soviet Union in 1993, he became a member of the Federation Council of the Federal Assembly, where he was a member of the Committee on Federation Affairs and Regional Policy until January 2002. Also, from 1996 to 1998, he was Chairman of the State Duma of the Yamalo-Nenets Autonomous Okrug.

== Legacy ==
On 9 December 2022, a monument to Sergey Korepanov was unveiled in Salekhard near the building of the legislative assembly of the district.
