= Amderma =

Amderma Амдерма
- City/town
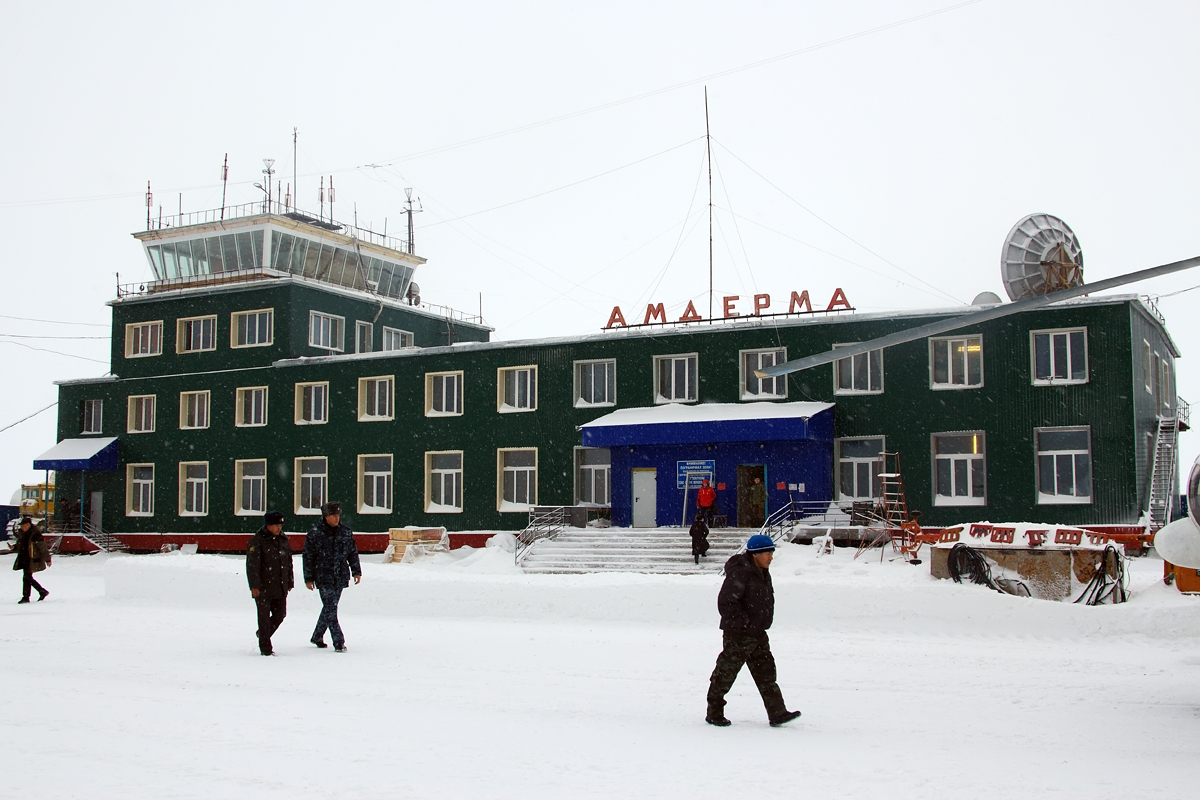

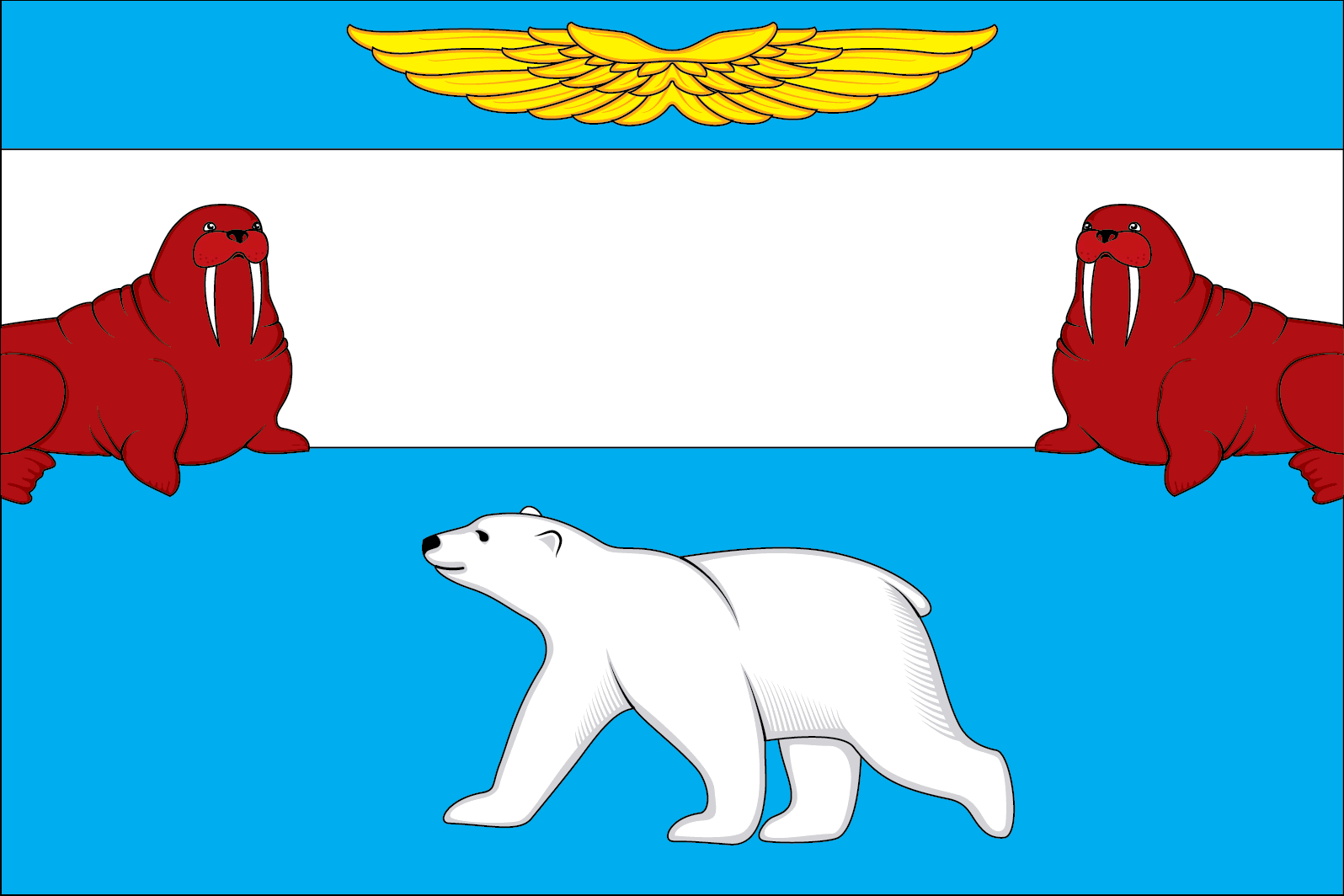
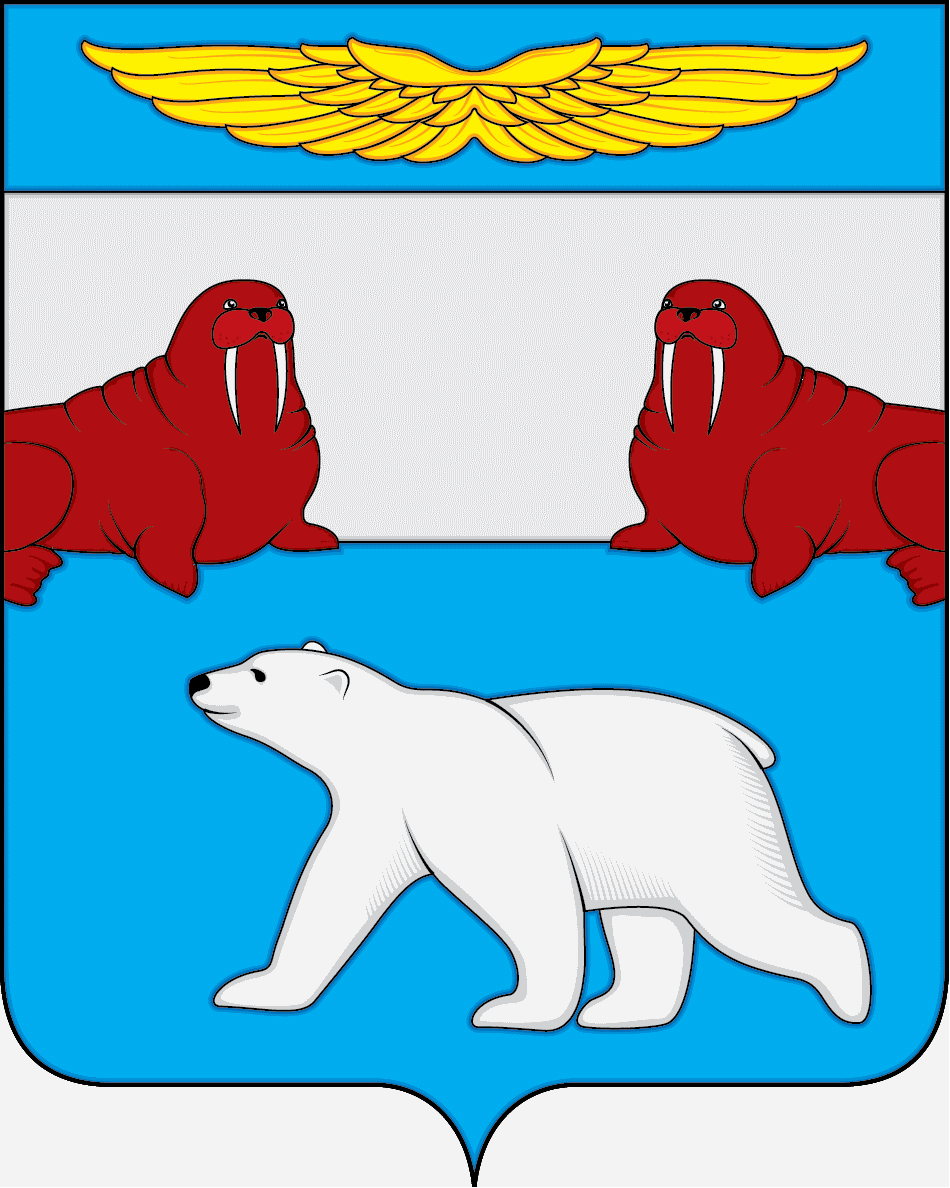
- Flag Coat of arms
- Interactive map of Amderma
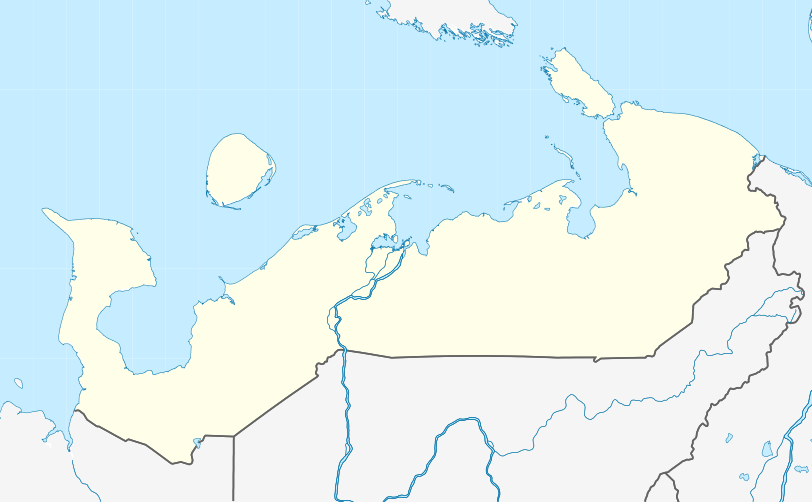
- Location of Amderma Amderma (Nenets Autonomous Okrug)
- Country: Russia
- Federal subject: Nenets Autonomous Okrug
- Founded: 1933
- Elevation: 20 m (66 ft)

Population (2010 Census)
  - Total: 541
  - Estimate (2024): 506 (−6.5%)
- Time zone: UTC+3 (MSK)
- Postal code: 166744
- OKTMO ID: 11811464101

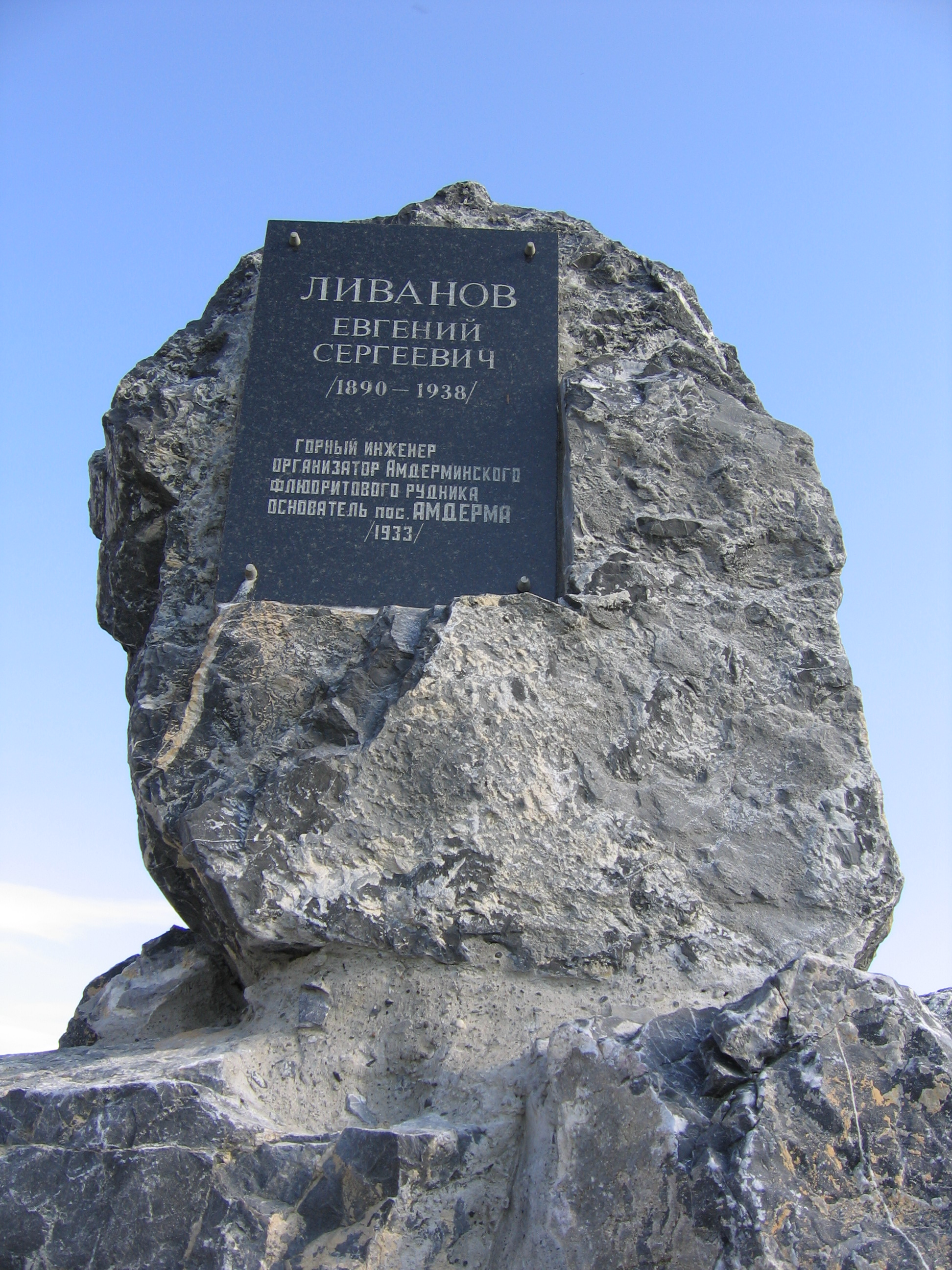
Monument to engineer Yevgeny Livanov, founder of Amderma (1933)

Amderma (Russian: Амдерма, lit. 'a walrus rookery' in Nenets) is a rural locality (a settlement) in Zapolyarny District of Nenets Autonomous Okrug, Russia, located on the coast of Kara Sea, near the Vaygach Island, 490 kilometers (300 mi) from Naryan-Mar, the administrative center of the autonomous okrug. Population: 541 (2010 census); 647 (2002 census).

== History ==
It was established in 1933. Previously an urban-type settlement, it was demoted to a rural locality in November 2005, but its rural status was not officially codified until a law to that effect was passed in April 2015.

== Climate ==
Amderma has a polar climate (ET) with very cool and short summers combined with very long and cold (but by Russian standards not severe) winters. Although relative winter temperatures normally hover around −20 °C (−4 °F), the transition months of May and October see a milder form of winter. As a result of the lack of regular warm temperatures Amderma is above the tree line. It experiences midnight sun and polar night. However, the cold Arctic Ocean tempers and reduces the heat effect midnight sun brings to inland locations further south such as Naryan-Mar. Brief warm temperatures have been recorded when southerly winds have reached the area with a July record high of 31.8 °C (89.2 °F). Winters are very cold for a marine location, but in spite of this there are several marine localities at lower parallels in North America that experience colder January lows than Amderma.

Climate data for Amderma (1991–2020, extremes 1934–present)
Month	Jan	Feb	Mar	Apr	May	Jun	Jul	Aug	Sep	Oct	Nov	Dec	Year
Record high °C (°F)	1.6 (34.9)	1.5 (34.7)	3.5 (38.3)	7.6 (45.7)	20.3 (68.5)	28.0 (82.4)	31.8 (89.2)	30.0 (86.0)	21.4 (70.5)	11.7 (53.1)	4.3 (39.7)	4.9 (40.8)	31.8 (89.2)
Mean daily maximum °C (°F)	−13.8 (7.2)	−14.3 (6.3)	−10.6 (12.9)	−6.3 (20.7)	−1.0 (30.2)	6.3 (43.3)	11.9 (53.4)	10.6 (51.1)	6.9 (44.4)	0.3 (32.5)	−6.3 (20.7)	−10.0 (14.0)	−2.2 (28.0)
Daily mean °C (°F)	−17.3 (0.9)	−17.7 (0.1)	−14.1 (6.6)	−9.7 (14.5)	−3.6 (25.5)	3.0 (37.4)	8.0 (46.4)	7.7 (45.9)	4.5 (40.1)	−1.9 (28.6)	−9.2 (15.4)	−13.4 (7.9)	−5.3 (22.5)
Mean daily minimum °C (°F)	−21.1 (−6.0)	−21.3 (−6.3)	−17.5 (0.5)	−13.1 (8.4)	−6.0 (21.2)	0.5 (32.9)	4.7 (40.5)	5.3 (41.5)	2.2 (36.0)	−4.4 (24.1)	−12.5 (9.5)	−17.0 (1.4)	−8.3 (17.1)
Record low °C (°F)	−42.4 (−44.3)	−44.6 (−48.3)	−43.1 (−45.6)	−33.9 (−29.0)	−26.0 (−14.8)	−9.5 (14.9)	−4.4 (24.1)	−3.3 (26.1)	−9.7 (14.5)	−27.7 (−17.9)	−34.9 (−30.8)	−39.7 (−39.5)	−44.6 (−48.3)
Average precipitation mm (inches)	29 (1.1)	21 (0.8)	21 (0.8)	22 (0.9)	27 (1.1)	39 (1.5)	49 (1.9)	47 (1.9)	46 (1.8)	50 (2.0)	36 (1.4)	30 (1.2)	417 (16.4)
Source: Pogoda.ru.net

== Economy ==
Fluorite deposits are located in the vicinity of Amderma, but the mines have been abandoned since the 1990s. It is home to the Amderma Airport, a civil airport and military base.
