= Purovsky District =

Purovsky District Пуровский район (Russian)
- District
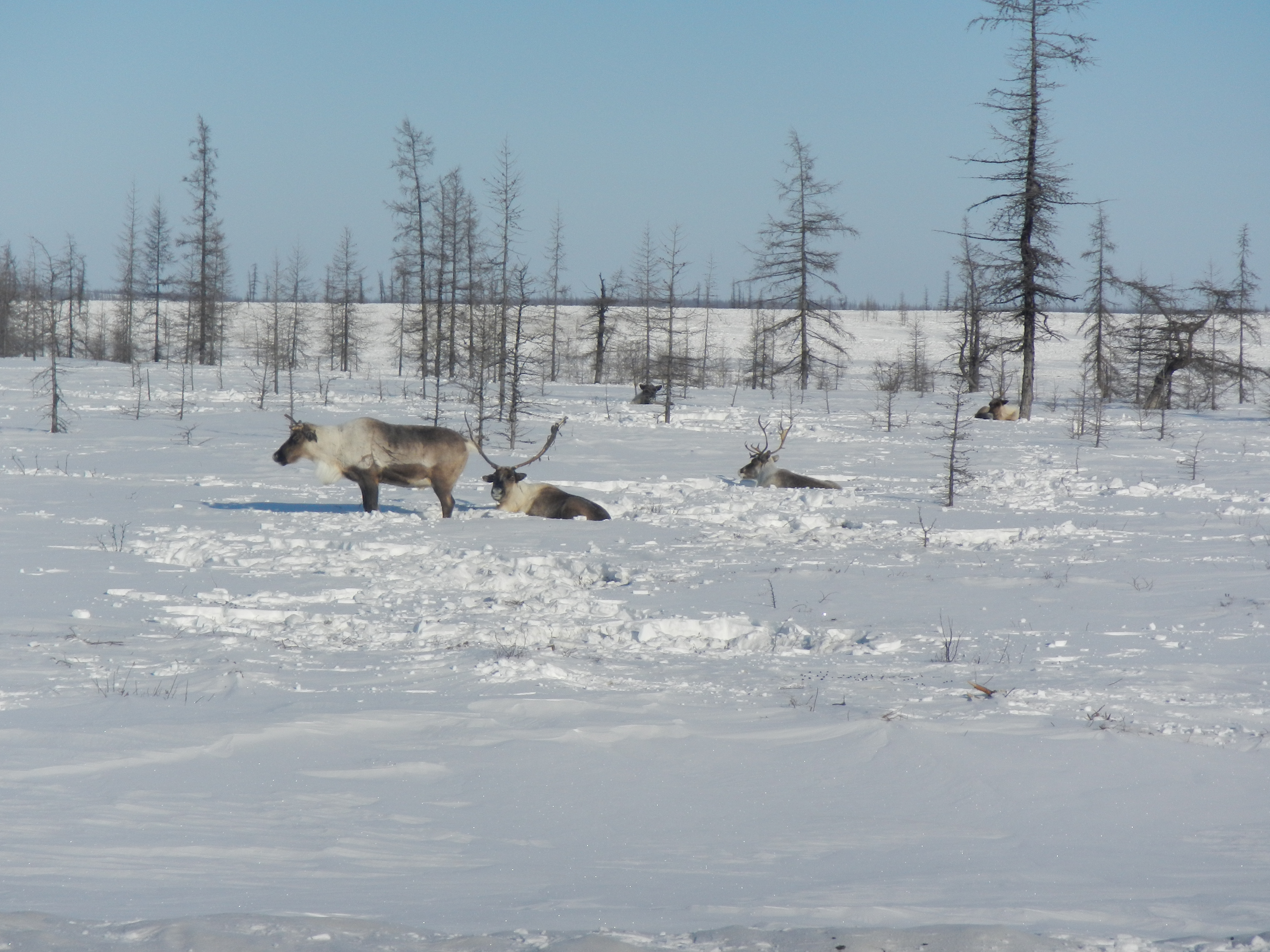
- Tidd-Ottynskyy reserve: Purovsky District

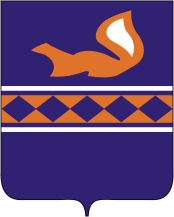
- Flag Coat of arms
- Anthem: Anthem of Purovsky District
- Location of Purovsky District in Yamalo-Nenets Autonomous Okrug
- Coordinates: 64°54′53″N 77°46′22″E
- Country: Russia
- Federal subject: Yamalo-Nenets Autonomous Okrug
- Established: 1932
- Administrative center: Tarko-Sale

Area
  - Total: 108,400 km^{2} (41,900 sq mi)

Population (2010 Census)
  - Total: 51,280
  - Density: 0.4731/km^{2} (1.225/sq mi)
  - Urban: 59.4%
  - Rural: 40.6%

Administrative structure
  - Inhabited localities: 1 cities/towns, 1 urban-type settlements, 8 rural localities

Municipal structure
  - Municipally incorporated as: Purovsky Municipal District
  - Municipal divisions: 2 urban settlements, 6 rural settlements
- Time zone: UTC+5 (MSK+2)
- OKTMO ID: 71920000
- Website: http://www.puradm.ru/

Purovsky District (Russian: Пу́ровский райо́н) is an administrative and municipal district (raion), one of the seven in Yamalo-Nenets Autonomous Okrug of Tyumen Oblast, Russia. It is located in the center and south of the autonomous okrug. The area of the district is 108,400 square kilometers (41,900 sq mi). Its administrative center is the town of Tarko-Sale. Population: 51,280 (2010 Census); 47,667 (2002 census); 56,049 (1989 Soviet census). The population of Tarko-Sale accounts for 39.8% of the district's total population.

== Geography ==
Purovsky District is named after the Pur river. Lake Pyakuto is located in the district.

== Demographics ==
Ethnic composition (2021):

- Russians – 57.0%
- Nenets – 15.2%
- Ukrainians – 4.1%
- Tatars – 3.8%
- Kumyks – 2.1%
- Azerbaijanis – 1.3%
- Selkups – 1.2%
- Dargins – 1.1%
- Bashkirs – 1.1%
- Moldovans – 1.0%
- Khanty – 1.0%
- Others – 11.1%
