= Gubkinsky (town) =

Gubkinsky Губкинский
- Town
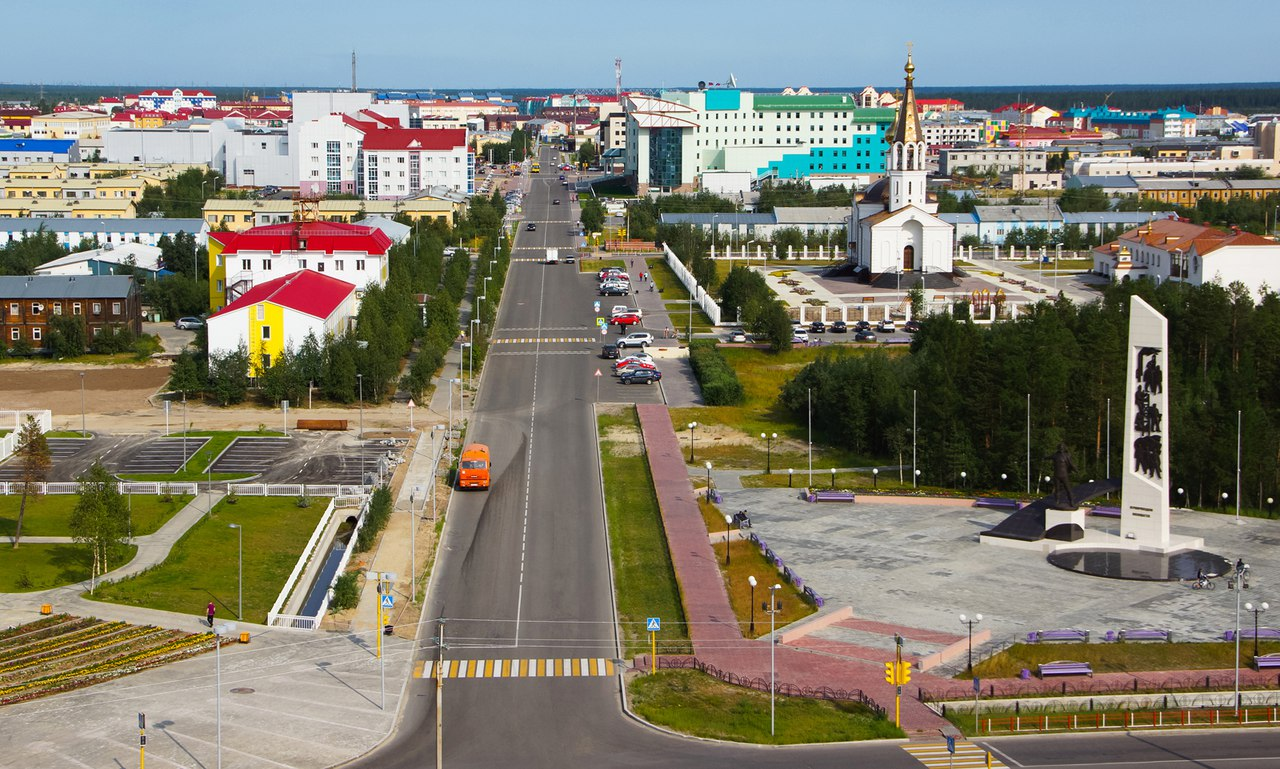
- Gubkinsky

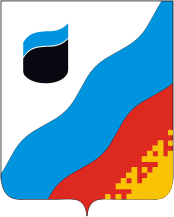
- Flag Coat of arms
- Interactive map of Gubkinsky
- Location of Gubkinsky Gubkinsky (Yamalo-Nenets Autonomous Okrug)
- Coordinates: 66°26′N 76°30′E
- Country: Russia
- Federal subject: Yamalo-Nenets Autonomous Okrug
- Founded: April 22, 1986
- Town status since: 1997
- Elevation: 55 m (180 ft)

Population (2010 Census)
  - Total: 23,335
  - Estimate (2023): 33,869 (+45.1%)

Administrative status
  - Subordinated to: town of okrug significance of Gubkinsky
  - Capital of: town of okrug significance of Gubkinsky

Municipal status
  - Urban okrug: Gubkinsky Urban Okrug
  - Capital of: Gubkinsky Urban Okrug
- Time zone: UTC+5 (MSK+2)
- Postal code: 629830
- OKTMO ID: 71952000001

Gubkinsky (Russian: Губкинский) is a town in Yamalo-Nenets Autonomous Okrug, Russia, located on the left bank of the Pyakupur River, south of Salekhard. Population: 23,335 (2010 census); 20,407 (2002 Census); 9,676 (1989 Census).

== History ==
The town is named after the Soviet geologist Ivan Gubkin. It was founded on April 22, 1986 as an oil-extracting settlement. Town status was granted to it in 1997.

== Administrative and municipal status ==
Within the framework of administrative divisions, it is incorporated as the town of okrug significance of Gubkinsky—an administrative unit with the status equal to that of the districts. As a municipal division, the town of okrug significance of Gubkinsky is incorporated as Gubkinsky Urban Okrug.
