= Zapolyarny, Yamalo-Nenets Autonomous Okrug =

Zapolyarny Заполярный
- Urban-type settlement
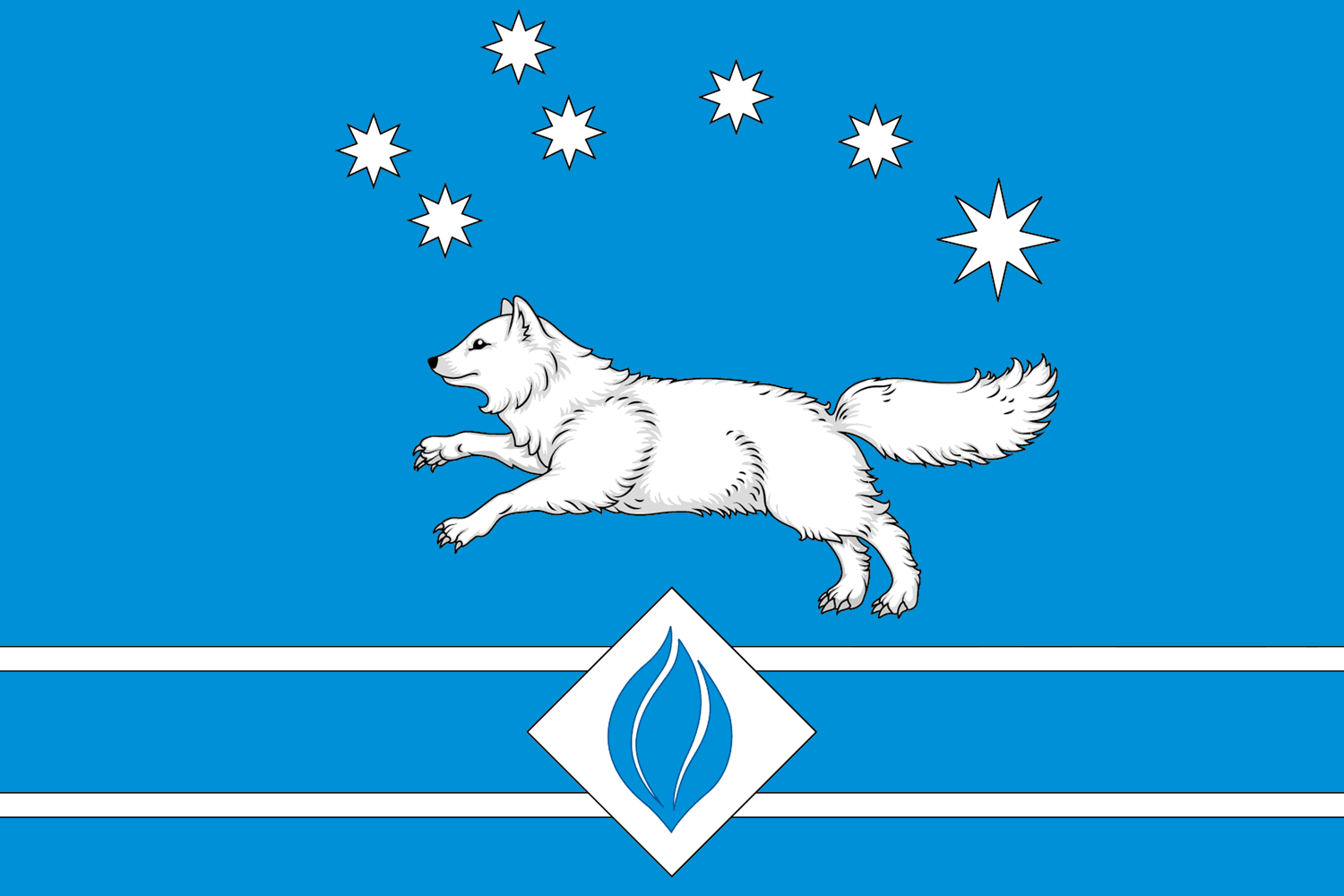
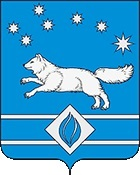
- Flag Coat of arms
- Interactive map of Zapolyarny
- Location of Zapolyarny Zapolyarny (Yamalo-Nenets Autonomous Okrug)
- Coordinates: 66.4526°N 73.8642°E
- Country: Russia
- Federal subject: Yamalo-Nenets Autonomous Okrug
- Administrative district: Nadymsky District
- Founded: 1984

Population (2010 Census)
  - Total: 1,024
  - Estimate (2021): 1,026 (+0.2%)
- Time zone: UTC+5 (MSK+2)
- Postal code: 629757
- OKTMO ID: 71916153051

Zapolyarny (Russian: Заполярный) is an urban locality (an urban-type settlement) in Nadymsky District of Yamalo-Nenets Autonomous Okrug, Russia. Population: 1,024 (2010 census); 995 (2002 census);
