= Muravlenko =

Muravlenko Муравленко
- Town
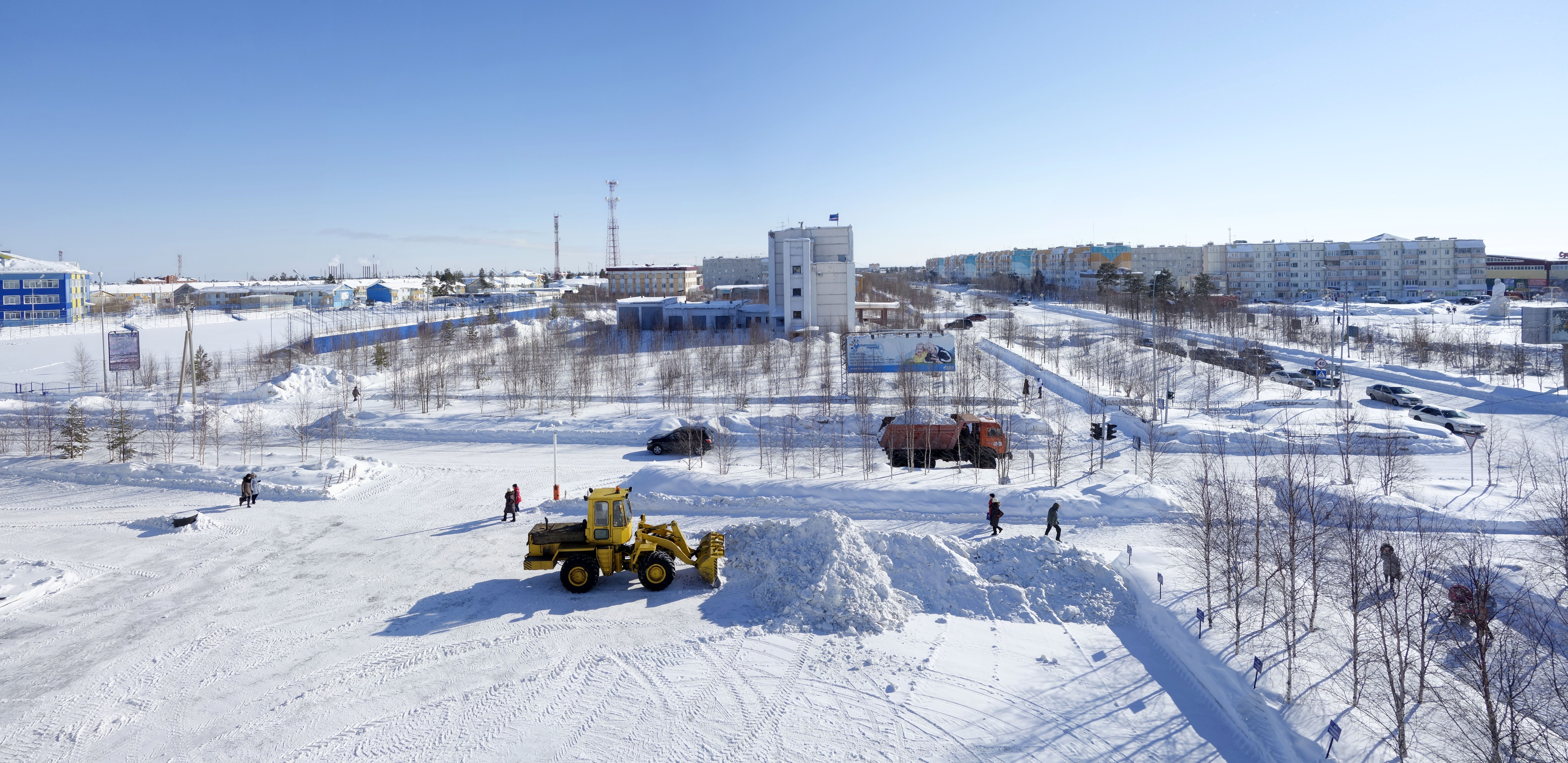

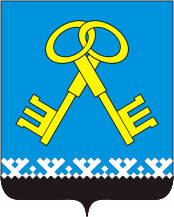
- Flag Coat of arms
- Interactive map of Muravlenko
- Location of Muravlenko Muravlenko (Yamalo-Nenets Autonomous Okrug)
- Coordinates: 63°47′28″N 74°31′30″E
- Country: Russia
- Federal subject: Yamalo-Nenets Autonomous Okrug
- Founded: 1984
- Town status since: August 6, 1990
- Elevation: 120 m (390 ft)

Population (2010 Census)
  - Total: 33,391
  - Estimate (2023): 29,306 (−12.2%)

Administrative status
  - Subordinated to: town of okrug significance of Muravlenko
  - Capital of: town of okrug significance of Muravlenko

Municipal status
  - Urban okrug: Muravlenko Urban Okrug
  - Capital of: Muravlenko Urban Okrug
- Time zone: UTC+5 (MSK+2)
- Postal code: 629600–629604
- OKTMO ID: 71955000001
- Website: www.muravlenko.com

Muravlenko (Russian: Муравленко) is a town in Yamalo-Nenets Autonomous Okrug, Russia, located 480 kilometers (300 mi) southeast of Salekhard. Population: 33,391 (2010 census); 35,926 (2002 census).

== History ==
It was founded as the oil-extracting settlement of Muravlenkovsky (Муравленковский) in 1984. It was granted town status on August 6, 1990.

== Administrative and municipal status ==
Within the framework of administrative divisions, it is incorporated as the town of okrug significance of Muravlenko—an administrative unit with the status equal to that of the districts. As a municipal division, the town of okrug significance of Muravlenko is incorporated as Muravlenko Urban Okrug.

== Twin towns ==
- Claremore, Oklahoma, United States
