= Nadymsky District =

Nadymsky District Надымский район (Russian)
- District
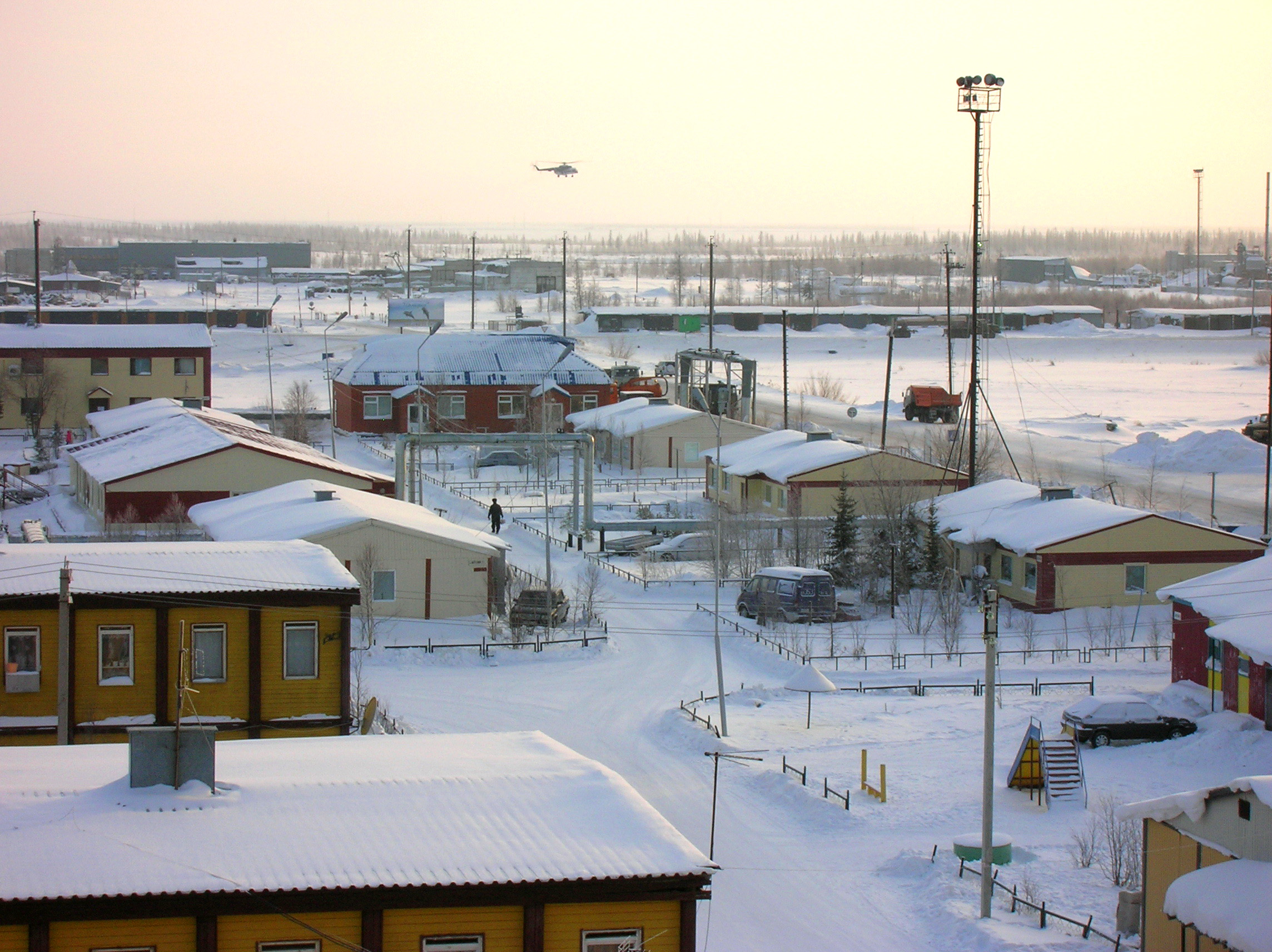
- Village Pangody, Nadymsky District

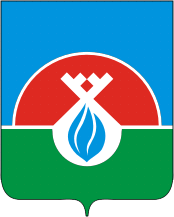
- Flag Coat of arms
- Anthem: Anthem of Nadymsky District
- Location of Nadymsky District in Yamalo-Nenets Autonomous Okrug
- Coordinates: 65°32′N 72°31′E
- Country: Russia
- Federal subject: Yamalo-Nenets Autonomous Okrug
- Established: December 10, 1930
- Administrative center: Nadym

Area
  - Total: 110,000 km^{2} (42,000 sq mi)

Population (2010 Census)
  - Total: 19,919
  - Density: 0.18/km^{2} (0.47/sq mi)
  - Urban: 59.4%
  - Rural: 40.6%

Administrative structure
  - Inhabited localities: 2 urban-type settlements, 8 rural localities

Municipal structure
  - Municipally incorporated as: Nadymsky Municipal District
  - Municipal divisions: 3 urban settlements, 6 rural settlements
- Time zone: UTC+5 (MSK+2)
- OKTMO ID: 71916000
- Website: http://nadymregion.ru/

Nadymsky District (Russian: Нады́мский райо́н) is an administrative and municipal district (raion), one of the seven in Yamalo-Nenets Autonomous Okrug of Tyumen Oblast, Russia. It is located in the central and southern parts of the autonomous okrug. The area of the district is 103,960 square kilometers (40,140 sq mi). Its administrative center is the town of Nadym (which is not administratively a part of the district). Population: 19,919 (2010 Census); 23,470 (2002 census); 29,772 (1989 Soviet census).

== History ==
The district was established on December 10, 1930 as an administrative division of Yamal (Nenets) National Okrug. At the time, the administrative center of the district was the selo of Khe. On May 23, 1931, the district was subdivided into two selsoviets: Nydo-Nadymsky and Yavaysko-Gydansky. The latter was renamed Maloyamalsky in 1935.

As of January 1, 1936, the administrative center of the district was the village of Nyda (the date on which the administrative center was changed is unknown).

On January 24, 1968, Nydo-Nadymsky Selsoviet was renamed Norinsky.

On February 11, 1971 Nadymsky Selsoviet was formed on the territory of the district. On March 9, 1972, the settlement of Nadym was granted town status and became the new administrative center of the district. At the same time, Nadymsky Selsoviet was abolished.

On October 12, 1976 Maloyamalsky Selsoviet was renamed Nydinsky.

== Administrative and municipal status ==
Within the framework of administrative divisions, Nadymsky District is one of the seven in the autonomous okrug. The town of Nadym serves as its administrative center, despite being incorporated separately as a town of okrug significance—an administrative unit with the status equal to that of the districts.

As a municipal division, the district is incorporated as Nadymsky Municipal District, with the town of okrug significance of Nadym being incorporated within it as Nadym Urban Settlement.

== Demographics ==
Ethnic composition (2021):

- Russians – 76.9%
- Nenets – 5.6%
- Tatars – 3.4%
- Ukrainians – 3.4%
- Azerbaijanis – 1.3%
- Bashkirs – 1.1%
- Others – 8.3%
