= City of federal subject significance =

Administrative division in Russia

City of federal subject significance is an administrative division of a federal subject of Russia which is equal in status to a district but is organized around a large city; occasionally with surrounding rural territories.

== Description ==
According to the 1993 Constitution of Russia, the administrative-territorial structure of the federal subjects is not identified as the responsibility of the federal government or as the joint responsibility of the federal government and the federal subjects. This state of the matters is traditionally interpreted by the governments of the federal subjects as a sign that the matters of the administrative-territorial divisions are the sole responsibility of the federal subjects themselves. As a result, the modern administrative-territorial structures of the federal subjects vary significantly from one federal subject to another; that includes the manner in which the cities of federal subject significance are organized and the choice of a term to refer to such entities. In the federal subjects which have closed administrative-territorial formations, those are often given a similar status. Occasionally, this status is also given to the areas organized around the inhabited localities which are not cities, but smaller urban-type settlements.

== List of designations ==
As of 2013, the following types of such entities are recognized:

English designation	Russian designation	Entity in which it exists	Type of higher level entity
Administrative-territorial formation with special status	административно-территориальное образование с особым статусом	in the Republic of Kalmykia	republic
City	город	the Republics of Dagestan, Kalmykia, and Khakassia	republic
City of republic significance	город республиканского значения	the Republic of Bashkortostan, Republic of Buryatia, Chechen Republic, Chuvash Republic, Republic of Crimea, Republic of Ingushetia, Kabardino-Balkar Republic, Karachay–Cherkess Republic, Republic of Karelia, Komi Republic, Mari El Republic, Republic of Mordovia, Republic of Tatarstan, and Udmurt Republic	republic
City under republic jurisdiction	город республиканского подчинения	the Sakha Republic and North Ossetia-Alania	republic
City under republic jurisdiction (urban okrug)	город республиканского подчинения (городской округ)	the Tuva Republic	republic
Closed administrative-territorial formation	закрытое административно-территориальное образование	the Republic of Bashkortostan	republic
Republican urban okrug	республиканский городской округ	the Republic of Adygea	republic
Urban okrug	городской округ	the Altai Republic	republic
City	город	Krasnodar Krai	krai
City of krai significance	город краевого значения	Altai, Khabarovsk, Perm, and Stavropol Krais	krai
City under krai jurisdiction	город краевого подчинения	Kamchatka and Primorsky Krais	krai
Closed administrative-territorial formation	закрытое административно-территориальное образование	Altai, Krasnoyarsk, and Perm Krais	krai
Krai city	краевой город	Krasnoyarsk Krai	krai
City	город	Chelyabinsk, Irkutsk, Ivanovo, Kaluga, Kirov, Murmansk, Novosibirsk, Orenburg, Pskov, Sverdlovsk, Tyumen, and Vladimir Oblasts	oblast
City of oblast significance	город областного значения	Arkhangelsk, Astrakhan, Belgorod, Kaliningrad, Kostroma, Kursk, Magadan, Nizhny Novgorod, Novgorod, Omsk, Oryol, Penza, Ryazan, Sakhalin, Samara, Saratov, Tambov, Ulyanovsk, Volgograd, Vologda, and Yaroslavl Oblasts	oblast
City under oblast jurisdiction	город областного подчинения	Kemerovo, Kurgan, Lipetsk, Moscow, Tomsk, and Tula Oblasts	oblast
City with the jurisdictional territory	город с подведомственной территорией	Murmansk Oblast	oblast
Closed administrative-territorial formation	закрытое административно-территориальное образование	Astrakhan, Kirov, Moscow, Murmansk, Orenburg, Saratov, Sverdlovsk, and Vladimir Oblasts	oblast
Municipal formation with urban okrug status	муниципальное образование со статусом городского округа	Leningrad Oblast	oblast
Okrug	округ	Tver Oblast	oblast
Urban administrative okrug/city of oblast significance	городской административный округ/город областного значения	Bryansk Oblast	oblast
Urban-type settlement of oblast significance	посёлок городского типа областного значения	Chelyabinsk and Kaliningrad Oblasts	oblast
Urban-type settlement under oblast jurisdiction	посёлок городского типа областного подчинения	Kemerovo Oblast	oblast
Urban okrug	городской округ	Amur, Rostov, Smolensk, and Voronezh Oblast	oblast
City of okrug significance	город окружного значения	Chukotka, Khanty-Mansi, Nenets, and Yamalo-Nenets Autonomous Okrugs	autonomous okrugs
City of oblast significance	город областного значения	Jewish Autonomous Oblast	autonomous oblast
