= Yamalo-Nenets Autonomous Okrug =

Yamalo-Nenets Autonomous Okrug Ямало-Ненецкий автономный округ (Russian)
- Autonomous okrug

Other transcription(s)
  - Nenets: Ямалы-Ненёцие автономной ӈокрук
- Flag Coat of arms
- Anthem: "Anthem of Yamalo-Nenets Autonomous Okrug"
- Coordinates: 67°15′N 74°40′E
- Country: Russia
- Federal district: Ural
- Economic region: West Siberian
- Established: December 10, 1930
- Capital: Salekhard

Government
  - Body: Legislative Assembly
  - Governor: Dmitry Artyukhov

Area
  - Total: 769,250 km^{2} (297,010 sq mi)
  - Rank: 6th

Population (2021 census)
  - Total: 510,490
  - Estimate (2018): 538,547
  - Rank: 72nd
  - Density: 0.66362/km^{2} (1.7188/sq mi)
  - Urban: 84.7%
  - Rural: 15.3%

GDP (nominal, 2024)
  - Total: ₽6.34 trillion (US$74.35 billion)
  - Per capita: ₽12.2 million (US$143,110.3)
- Time zone: UTC+5 (MSK+2)
- ISO 3166 code: RU-YAN
- License plates: 89
- OKTMO ID: 71900000
- Official languages: Russian
- Recognised languages: Nenets; Selkup; Khanty
- Website: https://yanao.ru

The Yamalo-Nenets Autonomous Okrug, (Note: Russian: Яма́ло-Не́нецкий автоно́мный о́круг, romanized: Yamalo-Nenetsky avtonomny okrug; Nenets: Ямалы-Ненёцие автономной ӈокрук, romanized: Jamaly-Nenjocije awtonomnoj ŋokruk) also known as Yamalia (Russian: Ямалия) is a federal subject of Russia and an autonomous okrug of Tyumen Oblast. Its administrative center is the town of Salekhard, and its largest city is Novy Urengoy. The 2021 Russian Census recorded its population as 510,490.

The autonomous okrug borders Krasnoyarsk Krai to the east, the Khanty-Mansi Autonomous Okrug to the south, and the Nenets Autonomous Okrug and Komi Republic to the west.

== Geography ==
The West Siberian petroleum basin is the largest hydrocarbon (petroleum and natural gas) basin in the world covering an area of about 2.2 million km^{2}, and is also the largest oil and gas producing region in Russia.

The Nenets people are an indigenous tribe who have long survived in this region. Their prehistoric life involved subsistence hunting and gathering, including the taking of polar bears; the practice of hunting polar bears (Ursus maritimus) continues up to the present time.

Yamalo-Nenets Autonomous Okrug is traversed by the northeasterly line of equal latitude and longitude, that is, at the point 70°N and 70°E, with equal degrees. The Polar Urals rise in the western part and the highest point of the okrug, as well as of the whole Ural mountain system, is Mount Payer.

The area consists of arctic tundra and taiga, with three large peninsulas – the Yamal Peninsula, Taz Peninsula and the Gyda Peninsula (itself containing the Yavay Peninsula and Mamonta Peninsula). There are nearly 300,000 lakes in the okrug, some of the main ones being Pyakuto, Chyortovo, Neito, Yambuto the 1st, Yarroto and Yambuto the 2nd.

The Ob River flows through Yamalo-Nenets Autonomous Okrug to the Kara Sea via the Gulf of Ob, which dominates the geography of the Okrug (together with its sub-bay, the Taz Estuary and neighboring Gydan Bay).

A number of islands are off the okrug's coast – from west to east, the main ones are Torasovey Island, Bolotnyy Island, Litke Island, Sharapovy Koshki Islands, Bely Island, Shokalsky Island, Petsovyye Islands, Proklyatyye Islands, Oleny Island, and Vilkitsky Island.

== History ==
On December 10, 1930, Yamal (Nenets) National Okrug (Ямальский (Ненецкий) национальный округ) was formed based on Ural Oblast.

== Administrative divisions ==
Number of districts (районы)	7
Number of towns (города)	8
Number of urban-type settlements (посёлки городского типа)	5
Number of selsovets (сельсоветы)	41
As of 2002:
Number of rural localities (сельские населённые пункты)	102
Number of uninhabited rural localities (сельские населённые пункты без населения)	19

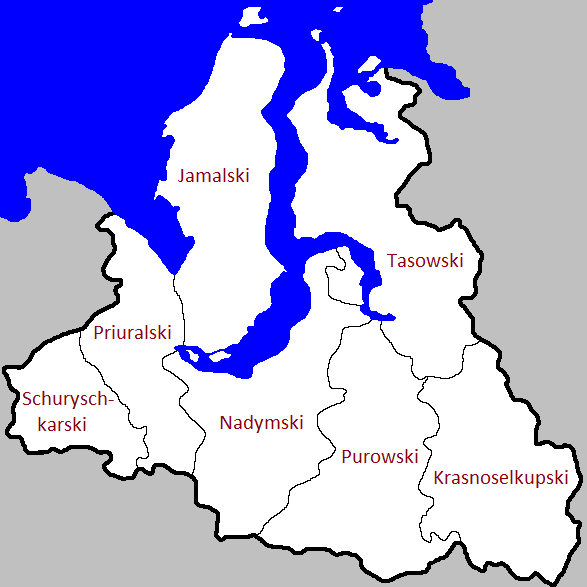
Map of Yamalo-Nenets Autonomous Okrug

Administrative and municipal divisions

Map

Division	Structure		OKATO	OKTMO	Urban-type settlement/ district-level town*	Rural (selsovet)
Division	Administrative	Municipal	OKATO	OKTMO	Urban-type settlement/ district-level town*	Rural (selsovet)
Salekhard (Салехард)	city	urban okrug	71 171	71 951		
Gubkinsky (Губкинский)	city	urban okrug	71 172	71 952		
Labytnangi (Лабытнанги)	city	urban okrug	71 173	71 953	Kharp (Харп)	
Nadym (Надым)	city	(under Nadymsky)	71 174	71 916		
Muravlenko (Муравленко)	city	urban okrug	71 175	71 955		
Novy Urengoy (Новый Уренгой)	city	urban okrug	71 176	71 956		
Noyabrsk (Ноябрьск)	city	urban okrug	71 178	71 958		1
Krasnoselkupsky (Красноселькупский)	district		71 153	71 913		3
Nadymsky (Надымский)	district	okrug	71 156	71 916	Pangody (Пангоды); Zapolyarny	8
Priuralsky (Приуральский)	district		71 158	71 918		6
Purovsky (Пуровский)	district	okrug	71 160	71 920	Tarko-Sale (Тарко-Сале) town*; Urengoy (Уренгой)	5
Tazovsky (Тазовский)	district	okrug	71 163	71 923	Tazovsky (Тазовский)	4
Shuryshkarsky (Шурышкарский)	district		71 166	71 926		8
Yamalsky (Ямальский)	district		71 168	71 928		6

== Demographics ==
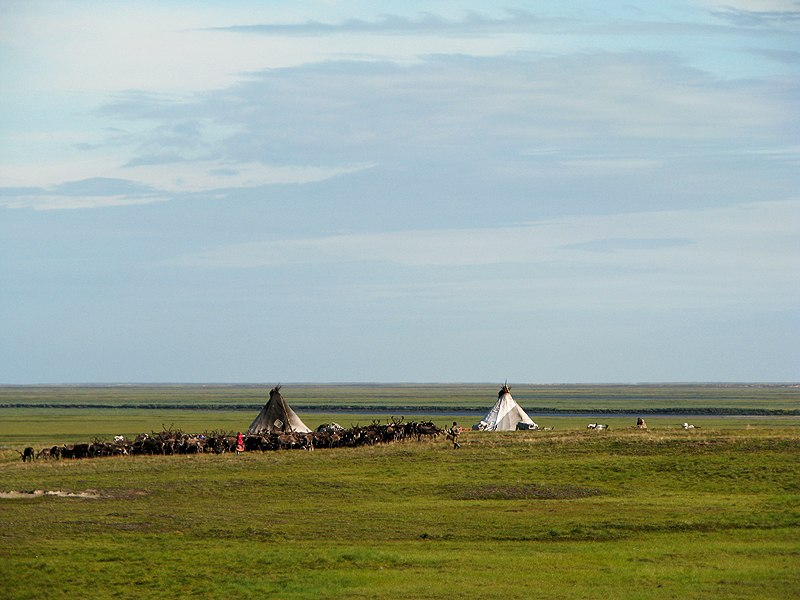
Nenets people in 2014

Historical population
Year	Pop.	±%
1959	62,334	—
1970	79,977	+28.3%
1979	157,616	+97.1%
1989	486,164	+208.4%
2002	507,006	+4.3%
2010	522,904	+3.1%
2021	510,490	−2.4%
Source: Census data

Population: 510,490 (2021 census); 522,904 (2010 census); 507,006 (2002 census); 486,164 (1989 Soviet census).

From 1960 to 2016, Yamal Nenets population increased from 60 000 people to more than 530 000 due to the natural resources discovered in the region. Currently, Yamal Nenets is the only Arctic Region in the Russian Federation that is not experiencing population decline. Despite the growing pressure on the regional environment, former governor Dmitry Kobylkin assured in 2016 that industrial developments are not affecting the traditional lifestyles of the native population. Official data accounts for an increment of 11 percent of the indigenous population from 2006 to 2016.

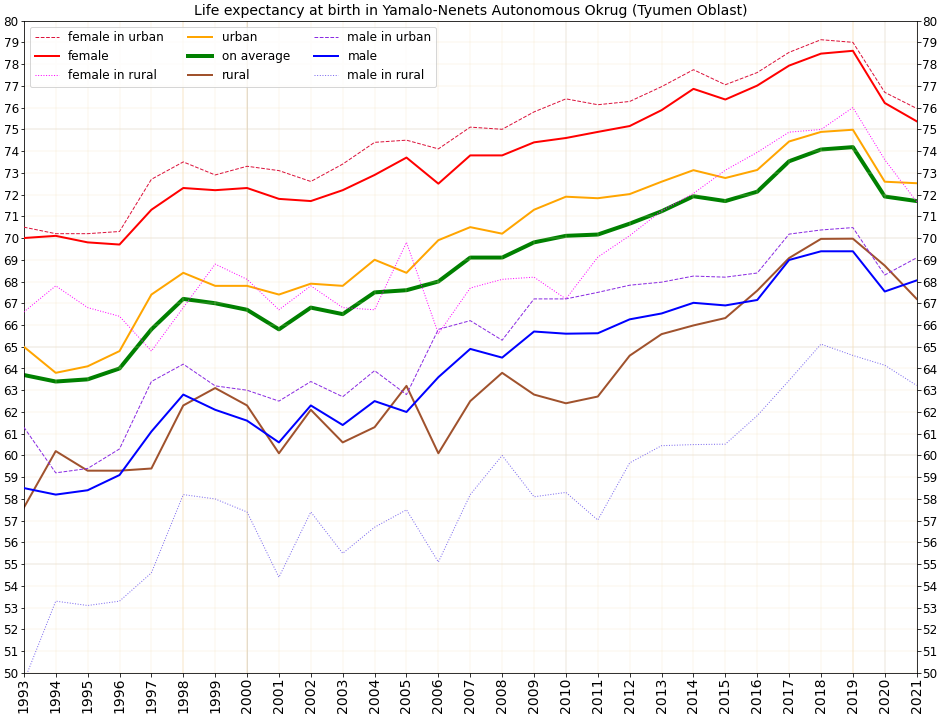
Life expectancy at birth in Yamalo-Nenets Autonomous Okrug

=== Vital statistics ===
Year	Average population (× 1000)	Live births	Deaths	Natural change	Crude birth rate (per 1000)	Crude death rate (per 1000)	Natural change (per 1000)
1970	84	1,683	879	804	20.0	10.5	9.6
1975	127	2,307	819	1,488	18.2	6.4	11.7
1980	194	3,347	1,178	2,169	17.3	6.1	11.2
1985	374	7,838	1,555	6,283	21.0	4.2	16.8
1990	489	8,032	1,631	6,401	16.4	3.3	13.1
1991	483	7,121	1,623	5,498	14.7	3.4	11.4
1992	470	6,123	2,108	4,015	13.0	4.5	8.5
1993	466	5,697	2,764	2,933	12.2	5.9	6.3
1994	473	6,274	2,998	3,276	13.3	6.3	6.9
1995	483	6,337	3,107	3,230	13.1	6.4	6.7
1996	489	6,241	3,004	3,237	12.8	6.1	6.6
1997	495	6,208	2,715	3,493	12.5	5.5	7.1
1998	498	6,395	2,544	3,851	12.8	5.1	7.7
1999	498	6,071	2,608	3,463	12.2	5.2	7.0
2000	497	5,839	2,763	3,076	11.7	5.6	6.2
2001	501	6,388	3,057	3,331	12.8	6.1	6.7
2002	506	6,635	2,934	3,701	13.1	5.8	7.3
2003	510	7,163	3,093	4,070	14.1	6.1	8.0
2004	511	7,264	2,975	4,289	14.2	5.8	8.4
2005	512	7,148	3,099	4,049	14.0	6.0	7.9
2006	513	7,036	3,000	4,036	13.7	5.8	7.9
2007	515	7,700	2,937	4,763	14.9	5.7	9.2
2008	517	7,892	2,959	4,933	15.3	5.7	9.5
2009	519	8,216	2,924	5,292	15.8	5.6	10.2
2010	522	8,263	2,873	5,390	15.8	5.5	10.3

==== Regional demographics ====
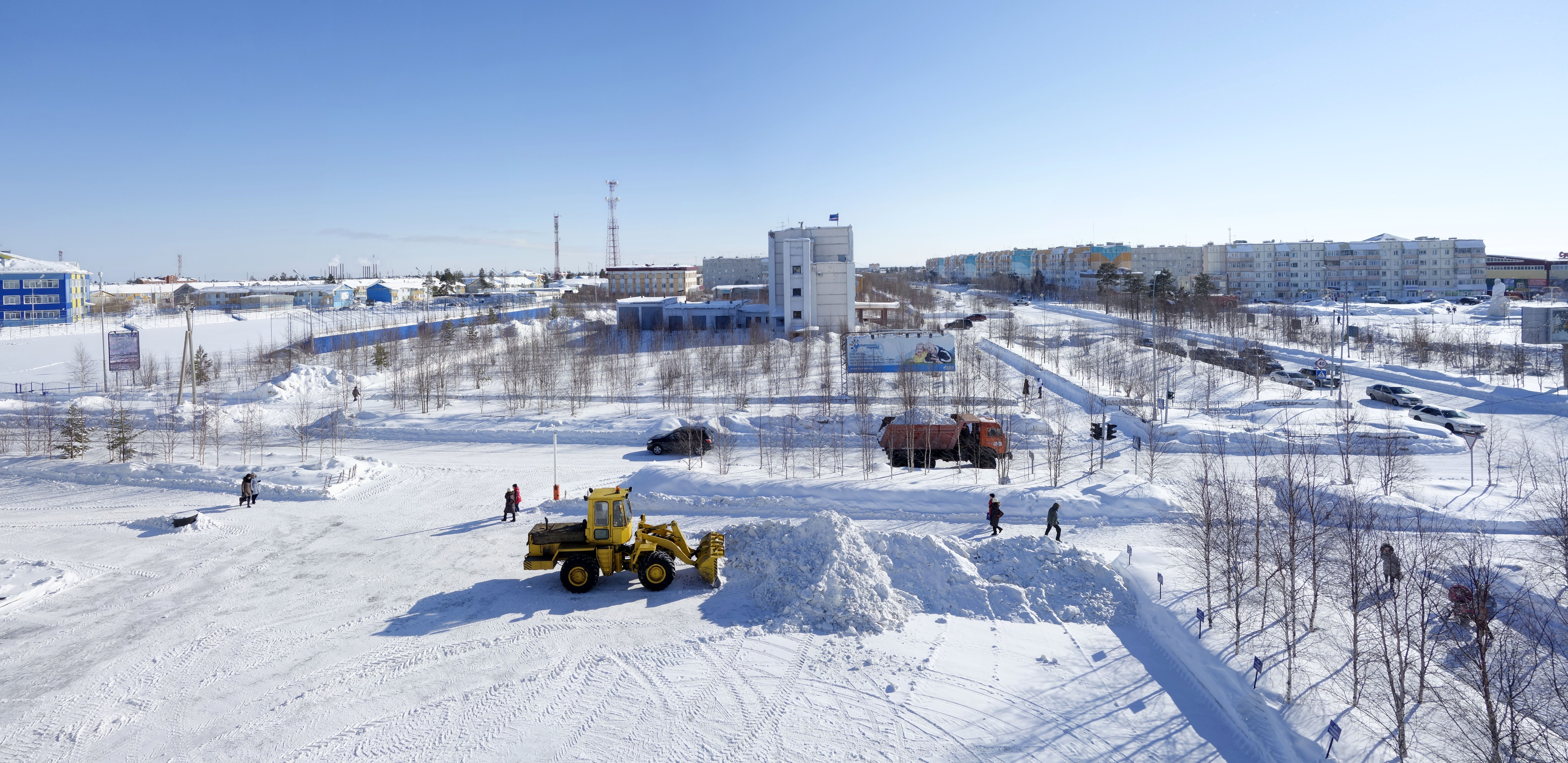
Muravlenko

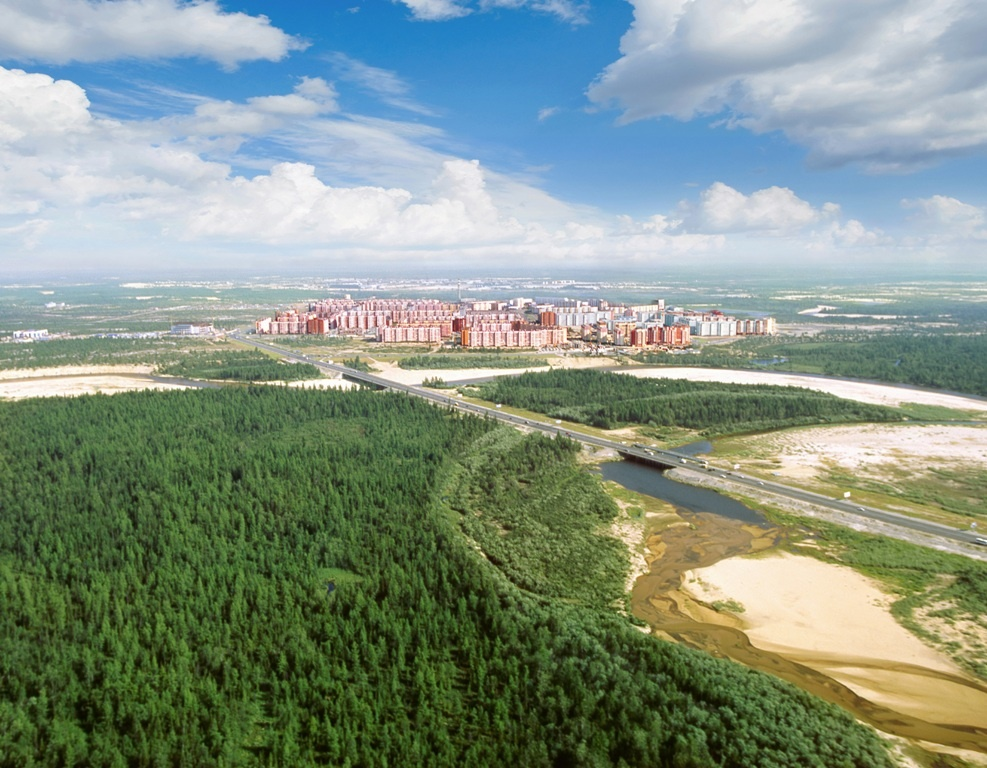
North Districts of Novy Urengoy

Raion	Pp (2007)	Births	Deaths	Growth	BR	DR	NGR
Yamalo-Nenets Autonomous Okrug	538,600	5,814	2,202	3,612	14.39	5.45	0.89%
Salekhard	40,500	499	256	243	16.43	8.43	0.80%
Gubkinsky	22,300	263	71	192	15.72	4.25	1.15%
Labytnangi	27,700	333	212	121	16.03	10.20	0.58%
Muravlenko	37,000	361	104	257	13.01	3.75	0.93%
Nadym	48,500	443	197	246	12.18	5.42	0.68%
Novy Urengoy	117,000	1,122	334	788	12.79	3.81	0.90%
Noyabrsk	109,900	1,029	384	645	12.48	4.66	0.78%
Krasnoselkupsky	6,200	99	41	58	21.29	8.82	1.25%
Nadymsky	21,300	221	67	154	13.83	4.19	0.96%
Priuralsky	15,300	179	72	107	15.60	6.27	0.93%
Purovsky	49,900	548	195	353	14.64	5.21	0.94%
Tazovsky	17,200	268	92	176	20.78	7.13	1.36%
Shuryshkarsky	9,900	144	69	75	19.39	9.29	1.01%
Yamalsky	15,900	305	108	197	25.58	9.06	1.65%

=== Ethnic groups ===
The Nenets make up 8.9% of the population, preceded by ethnic Russians (62.9%), and followed by Tatars (4.7%) and Ukrainians (4.5%). Other prominent ethnic groups include Khanty (2.5%), Azerbaijanis (1.7%), Bashkirs (1.5%), Kumyks (1.2%), and Nogais (0.9%) (all figures are from the 2021 Census).

Ethnic group	1939 Census		1959 Census		1970 Census		1979 Census		1989 Census		2002 Census		2010 Census^{1}		2021 Census	
Ethnic group	Number	%	Number	%	Number	%	Number	%	Number	%	Number	%	Number	%	Number	%
Russians	19,308	42.1%	27,789	44.6%	37,518	46.9%	93,750	59.0%	292,808	59.2%	298,359	58.8%	312,019	61.7%	253,306	62.9%
Ukrainians	395	0.9%	1,921	3.1%	3,026	3.8%	15,721	9.9%	85,022	17.2%	66,080	13.0%	48,985	9.7%	18,234	4.5%
Nenets	13,454	29.3%	13,977	22.4%	17,538	21.9%	17,404	11.0%	20,917	4.2%	26,435	5.2%	29,772	5.9%	35,917	8.9%
Tatars	1,636	3.6%	3,952	6.3%	4,653	5.8%	8,556	5.4%	26,431	5.3%	27,734	5.5%	28,509	5.6%	18,912	4.7%
Khanty	5,367	11.7%	5,519	8.9%	6,513	8.1%	6,466	4.1%	7,247	1.5%	8,760	1.7%	9,489	1.9%	9,985	2.5%
Komi	4,722	10.3%	4,866	7.8%	5,445	6.8%	5,642	3.6%	6,000	1.2%	6,177	1.2%	5,141	1.0%	3,556	0.9%
Selkups	87	0.2%	1,245	2.0%	1,710	2.1%	1,611	1.0%	1,530	0.3%	1,797	0.4%	1,988	0.4%	2,001	0.5%
Others	871	1.9%	3,065	4.9%	3,574	4.5%	9,694	6.1%	54,889	11.1%	71,664	14.1%	74,625	14.3%	70,873	15.1%
^{1} 17,517 people were registered from administrative databases, and could not declare an ethnicity. The proportion of ethnicities in this group is estimated to be the same as that of the declared group.

=== Religion ===
Religion in Yamalo-Nenets Autonomous Okrug as of 2012 (Sreda Arena Atlas)
Russian Orthodoxy	42.2%
Other Orthodox	0.6%
Old Believers	0.6%
Protestantism	0.6%
Other Christians	13.8%
Islam	17.4%
Rodnovery and other native faiths	1.4%
Spiritual but not religious	13.8%
Atheism and irreligion	7.8%
Other and undeclared	1.8%

According to a 2012 survey 42.2% of the population of Yamalia adhere to the Russian Orthodox Church, 14% are unaffiliated generic Christians, 1% are believers in Orthodox Christianity who do not belong to any church, 1% are members of the Slavic neopaganism (Rodnovery) or practitioners of local shamanic religions, and 1% are members of Protestant churches; Muslims, mostly Caucasian peoples and Tatars, make up 18% of the total population. In addition, 14% of the population declare to be "spiritual but not religious", 8% are atheist, and 0.8% follow other religions or did not give an answer to the question.

== Economy ==
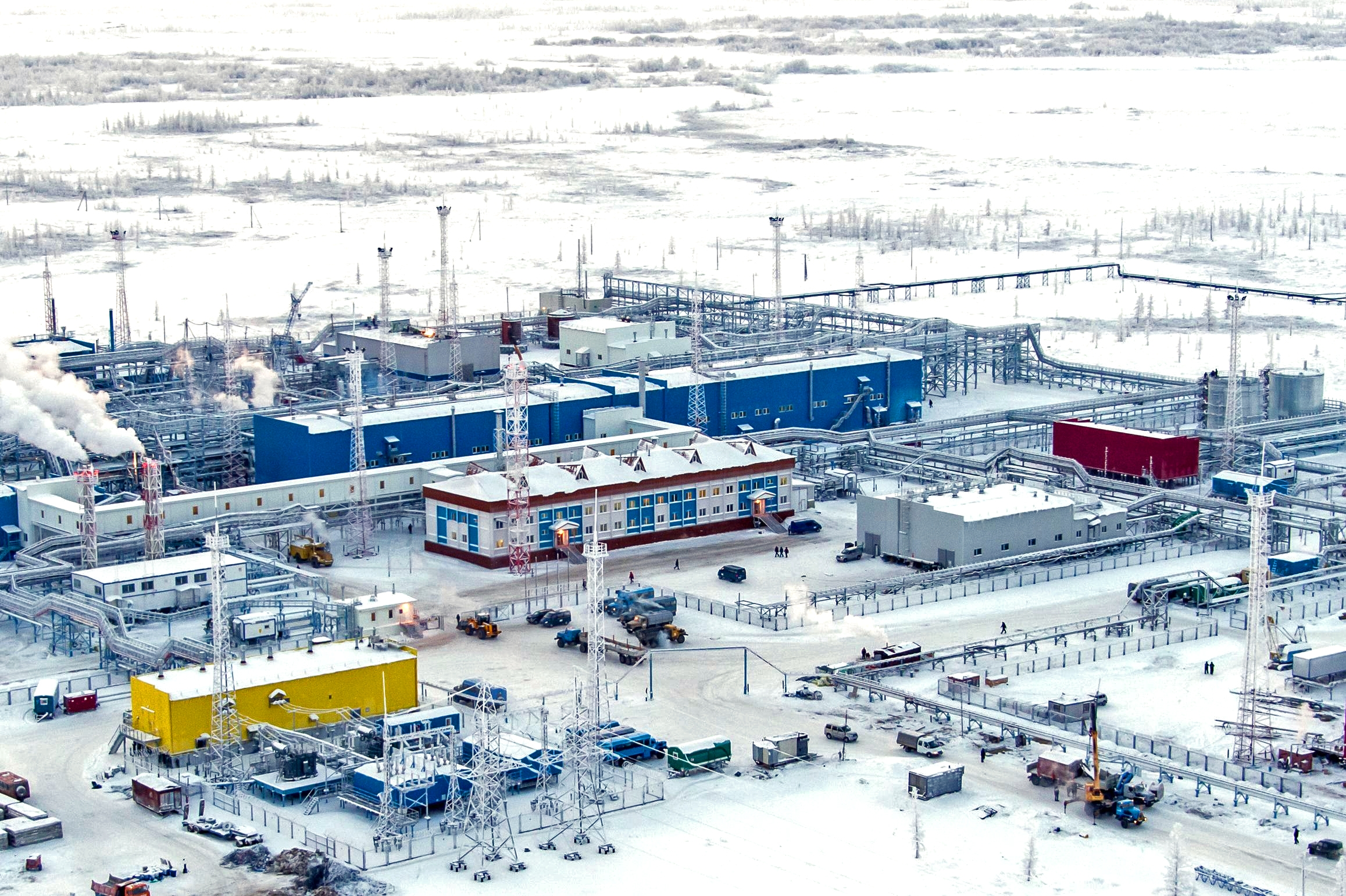
Zapolyarnoye gas field

In 2009, the Yamalo-Nenets Autonomous Okrug was Russia's most important source of natural gas, with more than 90% of Russia's natural gas being produced there. The region also accounted for 12% of Russia's oil production. The region is the most important to Russia's largest company Gazprom, whose main production fields are located there. Novatek – the country's second-largest gas producer – is also active in the region, with its headquarters located in Tarko-Sale. According to Novatek on 22 October 2019, the natural gas reserves in the Yamalo-Nenets Autonomous Okrug represent 80% of Russia's natural gas and 15% of the world's natural gas supply.

Since the early 2010s, Gazprom has been developing Yamal project in the Yamal Peninsula area. As of 2020, Yamal produces over 20% of Russia's gas, which is expected to increase to 40% by 2030. The shortest pipeline routes from Yamal to the northern EU countries are the Yamal–Europe pipeline through Poland and Nord Stream 1 to Germany. The proposed gas route from Western Siberia to China is known as Power of Siberia 2 pipeline.

== Notable people ==
- Anastasia Lapsui (b. 1944), Nenets film director, screenwriter, radio journalist

== See also ==
- List of chairmen of the Legislative Assembly of Yamalo-Nenets Autonomous Okrug

== Sources ==
- Законодательное Собрание Ямало-Ненецкого автономного округа. Закон №119-ЗАО от 17 ноября 2010 г. «О гимне Ямало-Ненецкого автономного округа». Вступил в силу со дня официального опубликования (20 ноября 2010 г.). Опубликован: "Красный Север", спецвыпуск №147/1, 20 ноября 2010 г. (Legislative Assembly of Yamalo-Nenets Autonomous Okrug. Law #119-ZAO of November 17, 2010 On the Anthem of Yamalo-Nenets Autonomous Okrug. Effective as of the day of the official publication (November 20, 2010).).
- Государственная Дума Ямало-Ненецкого автономного округа. №56-ЗАО 28 декабря 1998 г. «Устав (Основной Закон) Ямало-Ненецкого автономного округа», в ред. Закона №140-ЗАО от 21 декабря 2015 г. «О внесении изменений в Устав (Основной Закон) Ямало-Ненецкого автономного округа». Вступил в силу 15 января 1999 г. Опубликован: "Красный Север", 15 января 1999 г. (State Duma of Yamalo-Nenets Autonomous Okrug. #56-ZAO December 28, 1998 Charter (Basic Law) of Yamalo-Nenets Autonomous Okrug, as amended by the Law #140-ZAO of December 21, 2015 An Amending the Charter (Basic Law) of Yamalo-Nenets Autonomous Okrug. Effective as of January 15, 1999.).
