= Barabanov =

Barabanov (Russian: Барабанов, from барабан meaning drum) is a Russian masculine surname, its feminine counterpart is Barabanova. It may refer to

- Alexander Barabanov (born 1994), Russian ice hockey player
- Mariya Barabanova (1911–1993), Soviet and Russian stage and film actress
- Mykyta Barabanov, Ukrainian athlete
- Vasily Barabanov (1900–1964), Soviet NKVD officer
- Vladimir Barabanov, Russian politician

== See also ==
- Baraban (disambiguation)
