= Northern Latitudinal Railway =

Railway under construction in Russia

The Northern Latitudinal Railway
- Map of the Northern Latitudinal Railway

Overview
- Status: Construction suspended
- Locale: Yamalo-Nenets Autonomous District, Russia

Technical
- Line length: 707 km (439 mi)
- Track gauge: 1,520 mm (4 ft 11 27/32 in) Russian gauge

The Northern Latitudinal Railway (NLR; Северный широтный ход) is a Russian railway line previously under construction (construction is currently suspended) in the Yamalo-Nenets Autonomous District. It is 707 kilometres long, along the Obskaya - Salekhard - Nadym - Novy Urengoy - Korotchaevo route, which should link the western and eastern parts of the autonomous region, linking the Northern Railway in the east with Sverdlovsk Oblast. The project is run jointly by the Government of Russia, the governments of the Yamal-Nenets Autonomous District, PJSC Gazprom, JSC Russian Railways, and Development Corporation JSC. The construction coordinator of the railway is the Federal Agency for Rail Transport (Roszheldor). Construction of the NLR is planned to be carried out from 2018 to 2022. The estimated volume of traffic at completion is 24 million tons (mainly gas condensate and oil cargo). Initially, the highway was supposed to be laid by 2015, but due to the lack of a budget solution, the project completion dates were repeatedly postponed. In February 2017, the construction was announced to be completed in 2023. The project cost was estimated at 239 billion Rubles. In November 2022, it was announced that the government had suspended this project in favor of expanding rail eastward.

To date, the project for the potential continuation of the infrastructure construction of the Northern Latitudinal Railway further east to the seaport of Dudinka, with subsequent interfacing with the Norilsk railway, has received the designation as the «eastern shoulder» of the NLR or the «NLR-2» project.

== Project in strategic planning documents ==
The strategic programs of Russian Railways approved in the spring of 2019 - a Long-Term Development Program until 2025 with an Investment Program attached to it - speaks only of «strengthening the infrastructure» of two railways, Northern and Sverdlovsk, «within the framework of the project to create the Northern Latitudinal Railway». Accordingly, no specific sections or directions are given, in contrast, for example, to the same South Siberian Railway, which was included in the «modernization» package of the Transsib and is reflected in the investment program of Russian Railways within the fairly clear boundaries of the Artyshta - Mezhdurechensk - Tayshet line.

The state program «Socio-economic development of the Arctic zone of the Russian Federation», the last edition of which falls on the spring of 2020, does not clarify the understanding of the contours of the Northern Latitudinal Railway (undoubtedly one of the super-key infrastructure projects for the Russian Arctic). At the same time, curiously, the «Arctic» state program differs from Russian Railways in assessing the carrying capacity of the future line: from 20 million tons, given in the state program (and by 2020), to 23.9 million tons, declared in the investment program of Russian Railways.

In the Spatial Planning Scheme of the Russian Federation in the field of federal transport, under the title of the Northern Latitudinal Railway, only the section Nadym - Pangody - Novy Urengoy - Korotchaevo is indicated. Construction on the Obskaya - Salekhard and Salekhard - Nadym lines is planned «within the framework of the investment project «Ural Industrial - Ural Polar»». On the whole, everything is correct, but in this case, the strategic planning document does not set at least the general boundaries of the Arctic railway corridor, considering it not as a complex, but in scattered details.

And only in the departmental documents of the Ministry of Finance of Russia when approving budget classification codes for 2021 and for the planning period of 2022 and 2023. The northern latitudinal passage is finally taking shape: Obskaya - Salekhard - Nadym - Pangody - Novy Urengoy - Korotchaevo.

== History ==
The Salekhard–Igarka Railway was built between 1947 and 1953. It was not completed, although parts remained in use for many years. The railway included a ferry over the Ob River and, in winter, used seasonal tracks laid on the ice.

After the railway west of Korotchaevo became unusable, the Yamal Railway Company was founded in 2003 and new road construction was planned. In 2005, the development of industry and transport in the Yamalo-Nenets Autonomous Okrug (YNAO) and the Ural Federal District spurred the creation of the Ural Industrial-Ural Polar project; the name Northern Latitudinal Railway first appeared.

In 2006, the open joint-stock company Corporation Ural Industrial-Ural Polar was established to implement the project (since 2012, the OJSC Development Corporation). Since 2008, the project has been included in Russia's Strategy for the Development of Railway Transport. It includes:

- Construction of the Obskaya-2 station (PJSC Gazprom)
- Construction of a Salekhard bridge, a combined bridge across the Ob River (Roszheldor)
- Construction of the approaches to the Ob River bridge and the Salekhard station (government of the YNAO)
- Construction of the 353-kilometre (219 mi) Salekhard-Nadym line
- Construction of Nadym River Bridge (government of the YNAO)
- Reconstruction of existing lines:
  - Pangody-Nadym (PJSC Gazprom): 104 kilometres (65 mi)
  - Pangody-Novy Urengoy (Russian Railways);
  - Novy Urengoy-Korotchaevo (Russian Railways)

The Salekhard-Nadym line received preliminary approval in 2010. The line used reinforced concrete sleepers, in violation of permafrost construction standards. In November of that year, a company was founded to oversee the railway's construction and operation.

In July 2011, Deutsche Bahn and the Ural Industrial-Ural Polar corporation signed a cooperative agreement on the project. In September of that year, the Ministry of Finance ruled that the Ural Industrial-Ural Polar project was too costly to implement. On September 1, 2011, the YNAO began construction of a bridge over the Nadym River. In December, the Czech company OHL ZS agreed to invest €1.95 billion in construction of the railway. An agreement was signed with Czech banks which provided €1.5 billion for construction.

It was announced in February 2014 that the design and estimate documentation for the Salekhard-Nadym section and approaches to the bridge across the Ob River in the Salekhard area was ready, and Gazprom and Russian Railways had included funds for the reconstruction of existing railway sections. The entire project was approved in March 2015, including the Konosh-Chum-Labytnangi section. It was estimated that the railway would carry up to 23 million tons of cargo per year. On May 1 of that year, a station was opened in Novy Urengoy.

On September 12, 2015, the automobile portion of the 14 billion ₽, 1,300-metre (4,300 ft) bridge over the Nadym River was opened. Although the railway portion of the bridge was expected to be completed in 2016, in December 2015 the YNAO government opted to implement the Bovanenkovo-Sabetta railway project instead.

In March 2016, the construction of second tracks on the Tobolsk–Surgut–Korotchaevo section of the Sverdlovsk railway was proposed for the following year. On October 19, 2016, Russian Railways and the YNAO government signed an agreement for the NLR's construction.

On May 11, 2018, Transport Minister Maksim Sokolov, Russian Railways director general Oleg Belozyorov and YNAO head D. Kobylkin laid a time capsule in honour of the start of construction of a bridge across the Ob River, the first key part of the NLR. Belozerov said, "Today we not only give a symbolic start to the construction of a bridge across the Ob, but we are also opening a new stage in the history of the development of Russian transport infrastructure ... The Northern Latitudinal Railway will change the picture of transportation in the whole country".

== Overview of construction impact ==
Regional expert Rinat Rezvanov cites three main arguments that have emerged to date in favor of the development of infrastructure construction of the Northern Latitudinal Railway to the Dudinka seaport (and, accordingly, the Dudinka cargo station of the Norilsk railway):

First, the railway will pass through the complex of oil and gas fields in Eastern Siberia. This is not only the already mentioned Yuzhno-Russkoye oil and gas field, but also a whole group of fields included in the structure of the «Vostok Oil» project - these are 15 fields of the Vankor cluster, the West Irkinsky area, the Payakhskaya group of fields and the fields of the East Taimyr cluster. Accordingly, there is a need for transport and logistics support for the resource development of new circumpolar territories.

Secondly, the NLR-line gets an interface with one of the northernmost railways in the world - Norilsk. Thus, the region would have the opportunity to diversify transport links, both freight and passenger, by integrating into the network-wide system of rail links. Stable delivery of goods and products would minimize the existing dependence on the season and navigation period. In addition, the commissioning of the road would make it possible to begin a large-scale utilization of ferrous and non-ferrous scrap accumulated in the Norilsk industrial area.

The third argument is the formation of an Arctic Taimyr-Turukhan support zone in the region in accordance with the state program for the development of the Russian Arctic zone. The project plans to attract investments in the development of the infrastructure of the Norilsk industrial area, the creation of the Ust-Yenisei and Khatanga oil and gas production centers, as well as the Dikson coal mining center. The implementation of the project is expected to make it possible to annually export from the north of the Krasnoyarsk Krai up to 3 million tons of coal and up to 5 million tons of oil with the creation of up to 4 thousand additional jobs.

Russia has the largest known natural gas reserves, with about 25% of the world's total and has the eighth greatest amount of proven oil reserves. The largest reserves are in the Yamal Peninsula, more than 90% of Russia's natural gas being produced in Yamalo-Nenets Autonomous Okrug. The region also accounts for 12% of Russia's oil production. The Northern Latitudinal Railway will facilitate the shipping of oil and gas.

With the Arctic Ocean soon to be almost completely ice-free in summer and availability of Northern Sea Route, the railway will also help speed up the development of the country's Northern Sea Route infrastructure. The railroad will make conditions open to high-tech processing facilities on the Yamal Peninsula.

The railline will remove infrastructure limitations by forging transport links between Yamal and European Russia's industrial facilities and ports. It will also free up capacity on the Trans-Siberian Railway, and connect the Yamal Peninsula to the national and international rail network.

This railway will connect the two northernmost railways in the world; Norilsk railway and Obskaya–Bovanenkovo Line. It will also pave the way for connecting two navigable rivers in Siberia Ob River and Yenisei.
