= Nadym River Bridge =

Bridge in Yamalia, Russia

Nadym River Bridge Мост через Надым
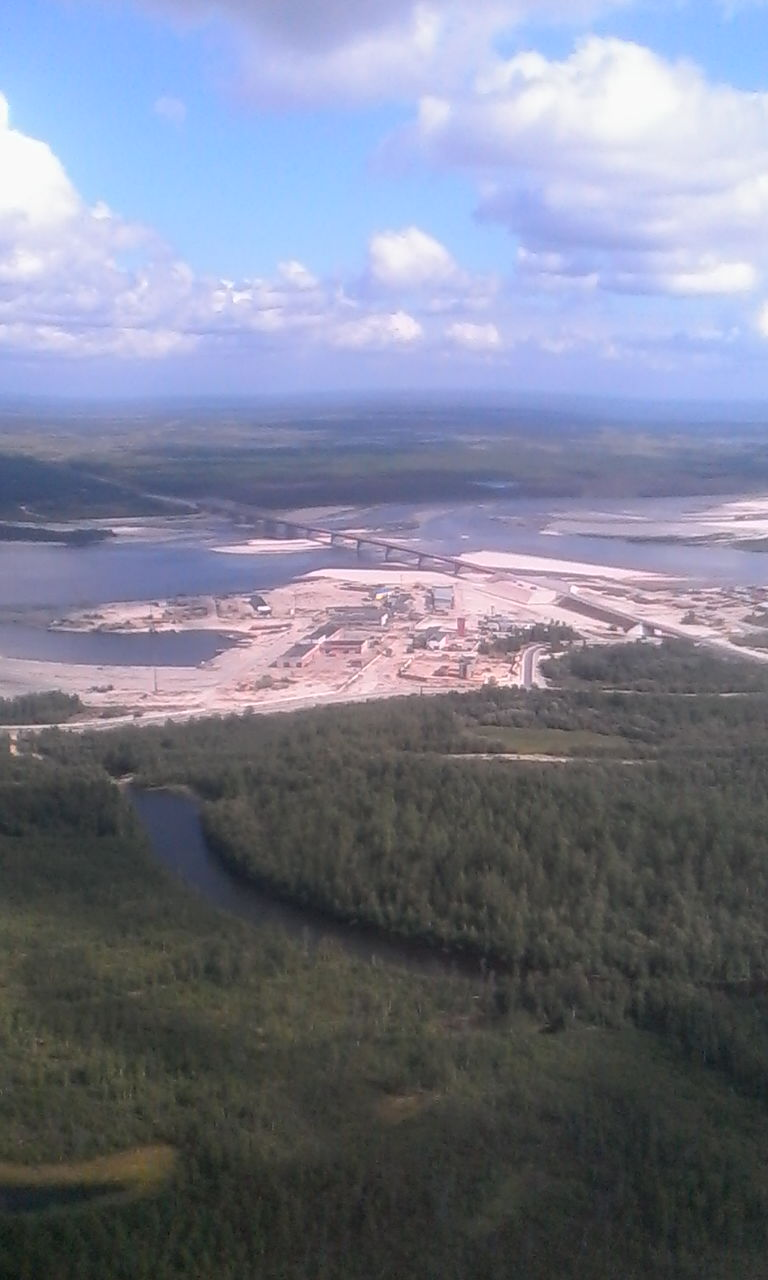
- Coordinates: 65°33′11″N 72°43′13″E
- Carries: combined (Trains, Motor vehicles)
- Crosses: Nadym
- Locale: Nadym, Yamalo-Nenets Autonomous Okrug, Tyumen Oblast

Characteristics
- Total length: 1334 m
- Longest span: 110 m

History
- Opened: 2015

Location
- Interactive map of Nadym River Bridge

The Nadym River Bridge is a combined single-level bridge that was opened on September 11, 2015. It is located simultaneously on the Surgut – Salekhard highway and on the Salekhard – Nadym – Korotchaevo railway line. It is an element of the Northern Latitudinal Railway project, designed to link the Arctic region with the central areas of Russia and the Urals.

The total length of the passage is 3.1 km, including the bridge (1334 m) and access areas (1770 m). The length of the superstructure is 110 m. The construction started in 2011, and the road crossing was opened in 2015. The construction of the railway part of the bridge was postponed.

The construction companies that participated in the erection of the bridge are OJSC Mostostroy-11, CJSC Kurganstalmost, and Llc Urengoydorstroy.
