= Norilsk Railway =

Single-track railway in Krasnoyarsk Krai, Russia

- Норильская железная дорога
- Map of Norilsk railway

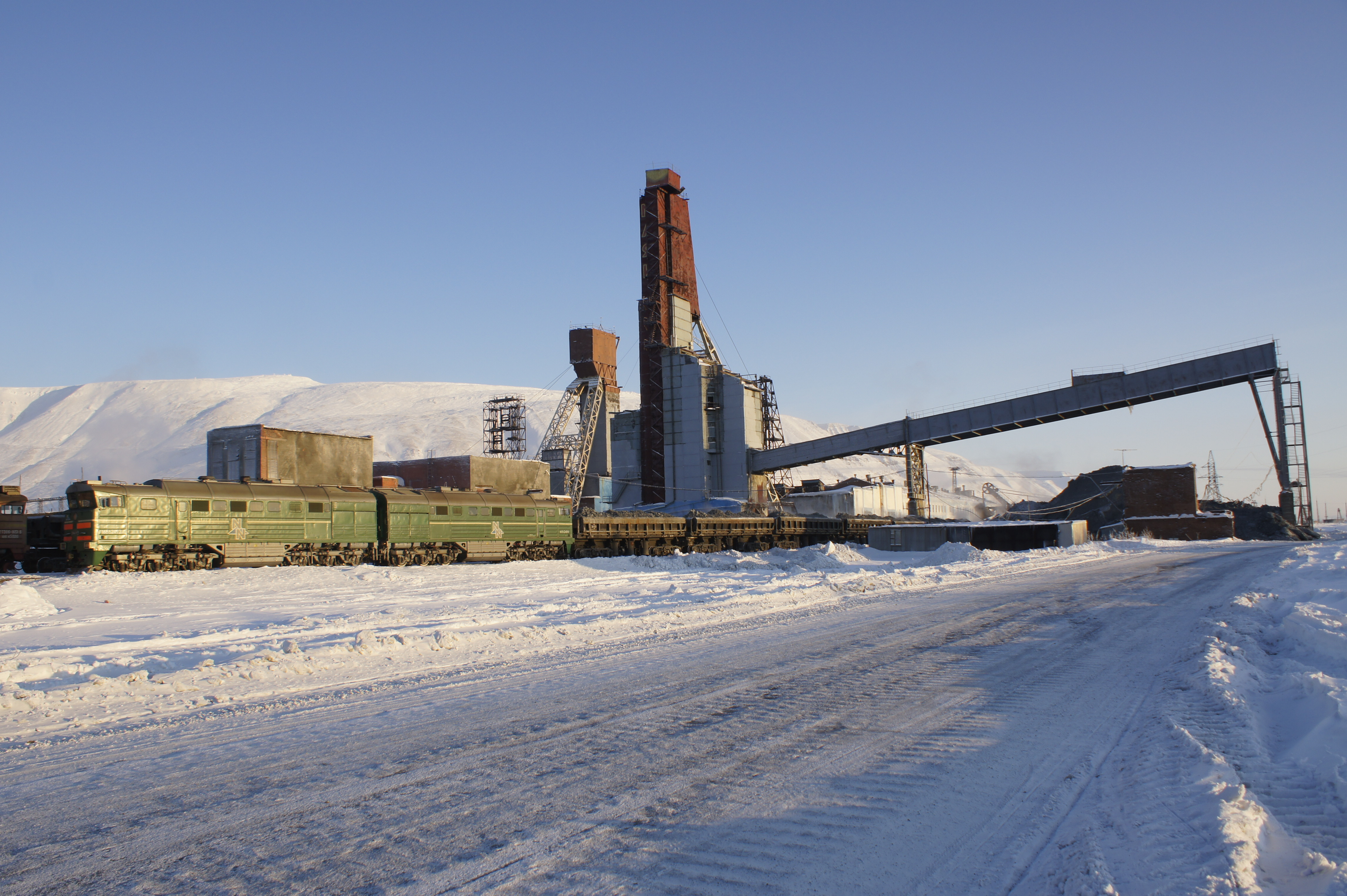
- Talnakh is a small station on the railway.

Overview
- Parent company: Norilsk Nickel
- Locale: Krasnoyarsk Krai; Taymyr Peninsula
- Dates of operation: 1937–present

Technical
- Track gauge: 1,520 mm (4 ft 11 27/32 in)
- Previous gauge: 1,000 mm (3 ft 3 3/8 in)
- Length: 127 km (79 mi)
- No. of tracks: 1

Norilsk Railway (Russian: Норильская железная дорога) is a single-track railway in northern Krasnoyarsk Krai, southern Taimyr Peninsula and connects the mining towns Talnakh, Norilsk and Kayerkan with the port Dudinka on the Yenisei. The railway line is 1,520 mm (4 ft 11 27/32 in) Russian gauge, and was partially constructed by the prisoners of Norillag. The Norilsk railway is not connected to the rest of the Russian network, and it used to be the northernmost railway line in Russia until 2010, when Gazprom completed its Obskaya–Bovanenkovo Line in the Yamal Peninsula, extending from the Salekhard–Igarka Railway.

The railway is owned by the Norilsk Nickel mining company and does not belong to Russian Railways.

== History ==
It was built in 1936 as 1,000 mm (3 ft 3 3/8 in) narrow gauge with 114 km (71 mi) long. Later, in 1953, it was rebuilt to Russian broad gauge and expanded to 231 km of track.

From 1957 onwards, the railway was electrified with 3kV DC in stages. Electrical Multiple Units of the ER1 and ER2 series were used for suburban passenger transportation. VL10 locomotives were used to haul heavy freight trains on the railway.

In the 1990s, the railway was in serious decline. In 1998 the electric catenary was removed and the electric rolling stock sold off. Diesel locomotives haul freight trains since then, passenger service on the railway was discontinued.

In the early 1990s, a paved highway connecting Norilsk with Dudinka was completed. The passenger train service on the Norilsk Line ended in 1998. The former passenger depot is now the Nornickel rail division office and houses a rail museum in the former waiting room.

== See also ==
- Salekhard–Igarka Railway
