= Ion-Georgy Kostev =

Russian ice hockey player

- Born: March 24, 1990 (age 35); Salekhard, Russian SFSR
- Height: 6 ft 3 in (191 cm)
- Weight: 185 lb (84 kg; 13 st 3 lb)
- Position: Defence
- Shoots: Left
- team Former teams: Free Agent; Neftekhimik Nizhnekamsk
- Playing career: 2009–present

Ion-Georgy Kostev (born March 24, 1990) is a Russian professional ice hockey defenceman who is an unrestricted free agent. He most notably played for HC Neftekhimik Nizhnekamsk of the Kontinental Hockey League (KHL).

On October 16, 2018, Kostev was given a two-year ban for a doping violation.
