= Salekhard–Igarka Railway =

Incomplete railway line in Yamalo-Nenets Autonomous Okrug, Russia

Coordinates: 65°51′00″N 88°04′00″E

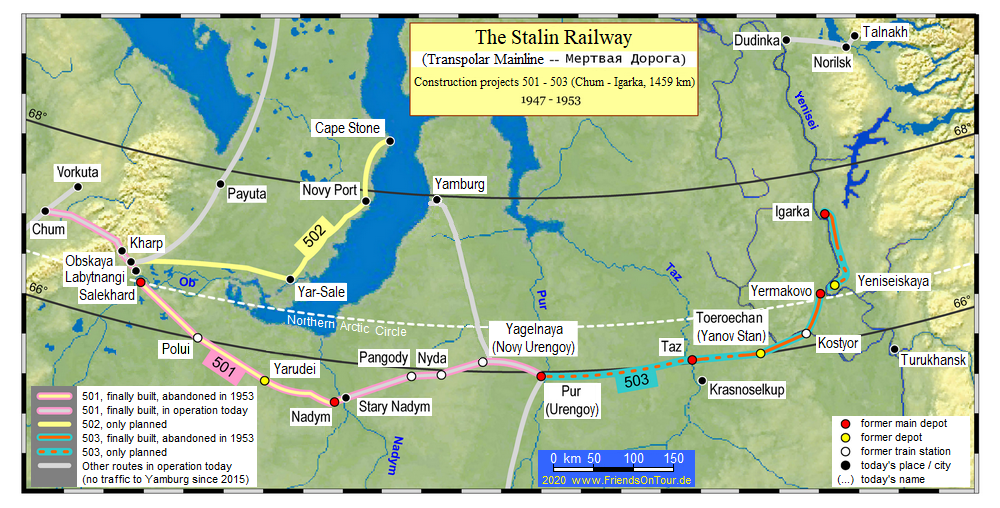
- Map of the Stalin Railway

Overview
- Status: incomplete
- Locale: Yamalo-Nenets Autonomous District, Russia

History
- Opened: 1949
- Closed: 1953

Technical
- Line length: 1,459 km (907 mi)
- Track gauge: 1,524 mm (5 ft)

The 1,524 mm (5 ft) broad gauge Salekhard–Igarka Railway (Russian: Трансполярная магистраль, romanized: Transpolyarnaya Magistral, i.e. 'Transpolar Mainline', popularly known as the Dead Road) is an incomplete railway in northern Siberia. The railway was a project of the Soviet Gulag system that took place from 1947 until Stalin's death in 1953. Its construction was coordinated via two separate Gulag projects, the 501 Railway beginning on the River Ob and 503 Railway beginning on the River Yenisey, part of a grand design of Joseph Stalin to span a railway across northern Siberia to reach the Soviet Union's easternmost territories.

Salekhard–Igarka route marked in red

A rebuilt section of the railway between Nadym and Novy Urengoy on the east bank of the Nadym River is still in operation, as is the extreme western section connecting Labytnangi and the railway to Vorkuta. The section from Salekhard to Nadym is planned to be rebuilt, including a new bridge over the Ob to connect Salekhard to the rest of the Russian railway system via Labytnangi. The section from Nadym to Pangody is also planned to be rebuilt.

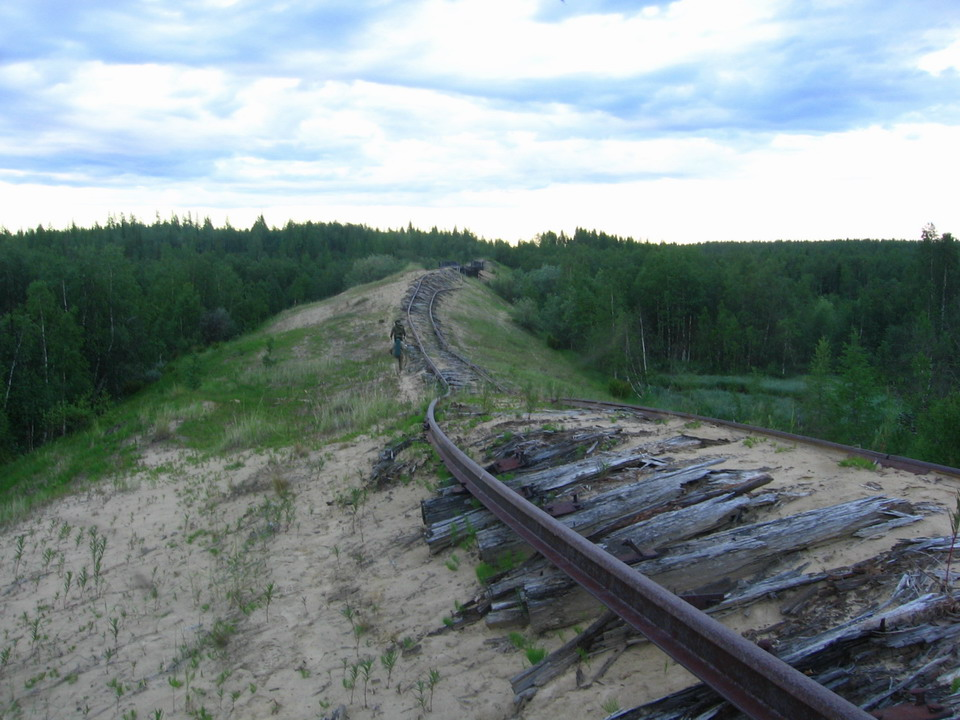
Railway between Salekhard and Nadym

== Purpose ==
The purpose of the railway was threefold: to facilitate the export of nickel from neighbouring Norilsk; to provide work for thousands of post-war prisoners; and to connect the deep-water seaports of Igarka and Salekhard with the western Russian railway network. With the Soviet industry relocated to western Siberia during World War II, it was seen as a strategic advantage to use the northward-flowing river systems to deliver supplies to Arctic Ocean ports. Salekhard, which was previously called Obdorsk, was on the Ob River, downstream from Novosibirsk and Omsk, and Igarka was on the Yenisei, which flowed north from Krasnoyarsk, Irkutsk, and the mountains around Lake Baikal. Connecting these two rivers was beneficial for transferring goods between cities and regions.

== History ==
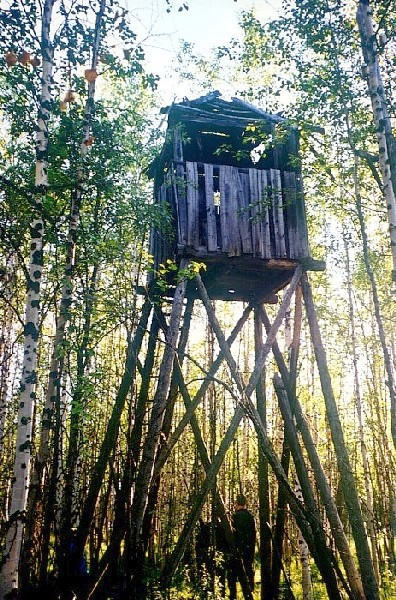
Watchtower near Turukhansk, Part of 503rd Labour Camp

Detailed map of Salekhard–Igarka railway. Sections built and abandoned in 1950-s shown in red.

Construction of the Salekhard–Igarka Railway began in the summer of 1949 under the supervision of Col. V.A. Barabanov. The 501st Labour Camp began work eastwards from Salekhard, while the 503rd Labour Camp pushed westwards from Igarka. Plans called for a single-track railway line with 28 stations and 106 sidings. It was not feasible to span the 2.3 km Ob River crossing or the 1.6 km wide Yenisei River crossing. Ferries were used in the summer, while in the winter, trains crossed the river using a track laid on the ice, using specially strengthened crossties.

A 1955 CIA paper detailed the construction method. After the course of the railway had been surveyed, a corduroy road was built over swampy ground. That was covered by layers of fascine, covered in turn by sand brought in by dump trucks. A 20-centimetre (7.9 in) layer of ballast was placed on the sand, and was topped by additional sand on which the crossties were emplaced. The line had many curves because of the need to avoid swamps.

It was estimated that anywhere from 80,000 to 120,000 labourers were engaged in the project. In the winter, construction was hampered by severe cold, permafrost, and food shortages. In the summer there were the problems of boggy terrain, diseases, and attacks by mosquitoes, gnats, midges, and horseflies. On the technical side, engineering problems included the difficulty of construction across permafrost, a poor logistical system, and tight deadlines, compounded by a severe lack of power machinery. As a result, railway embankments slowly settled into the marsh or were eroded by water pooling behind them. A shortage of materials also affected the project. One-metre segments of damaged rail lines from war-torn areas had to be sent in and welded to form 10-metre lengths.

As the project progressed, it became clear that there was little need for the railway. In 1952, officials permitted a reduced tempo of work. Construction was stopped in 1953 after Stalin's death. A total of 698 kilometres (434 mi) of railway were completed at an official cost of 260 million rubles, later estimated to be near 42 billion 1953 rubles (2.5% of total Soviet capital investment at the time, or about $10 billion in 1950 dollars). The project was quickly destroyed by frost heaves and structural failures arising from poor construction. At least 11 locomotives and 60,000 tons of metal were abandoned, and bridges gradually decayed or burned down. However, the corridor's telephone network remained in service until 1976.

About 350 km of track between Salekhard and Nadym remained in operation from the 1950s to the 1980s. However, in 1990, the line was shut down, and due to rising steel prices the first 92 km of rail from Salekhard were dismantled and recycled during the 1990s.

== Current operations and future prospects ==
The far western section of the railway, linking Labytnangi with the railway to Vorkuta, and thus to the rest of the Russian rail network, is the only section that has continuously remained in operation. A bridge across the Ob to Salekhard is currently being built.

The section between Pangody and Novy Urengoy was rebuilt in the 1970s with the development of the gas deposits in the region, including a branch to Yamburg. The line connects to the rest of the Russian rail network at Korotchayevo.

Around the year 2000, discussion began about building a railway to Norilsk, about 220 km from Igarka, following much of the original corridor, to support the nickel and petroleum industry.

Known as part of the Northern Latitudinal Route, new construction of the railway section between Salekhard and Nadym allegedly started on 19 March 2010 in Salekhard. This section was originally proposed to be finished in 2014 and opened in 2015, with combined road-rail bridges across the Ob and Nadym rivers, thus connecting to the existing Russian railway system at both ends.

As of 2016, the reconstruction of the Salekhard–Nadym line (in 1,520 mm (4 ft 11 27/32 in) gauge) was projected to take place between 2018–2022.

As of April 2020, the Salekhard-Nadym line construction was ongoing, including a new bridge where the line crosses the Ob river. The process is expected to be complete in 2030.

== See also ==
- Northern Latitudinal Railway
- Rail transport in the Soviet Union
