= Baraban (disambiguation) =

Baraban may refer to:

- Barabàn, an Italian folk music group
- Baraban (drum)
- Ivan Baraban, Croatian professional footballer
- Baraban, Perm Krai, Russia
