= Salekhard =

Salekhard Салехард
- Town

Other transcription(s)
  - Nenets: Саляʼ харад
  - Khanty: Пуӆңават
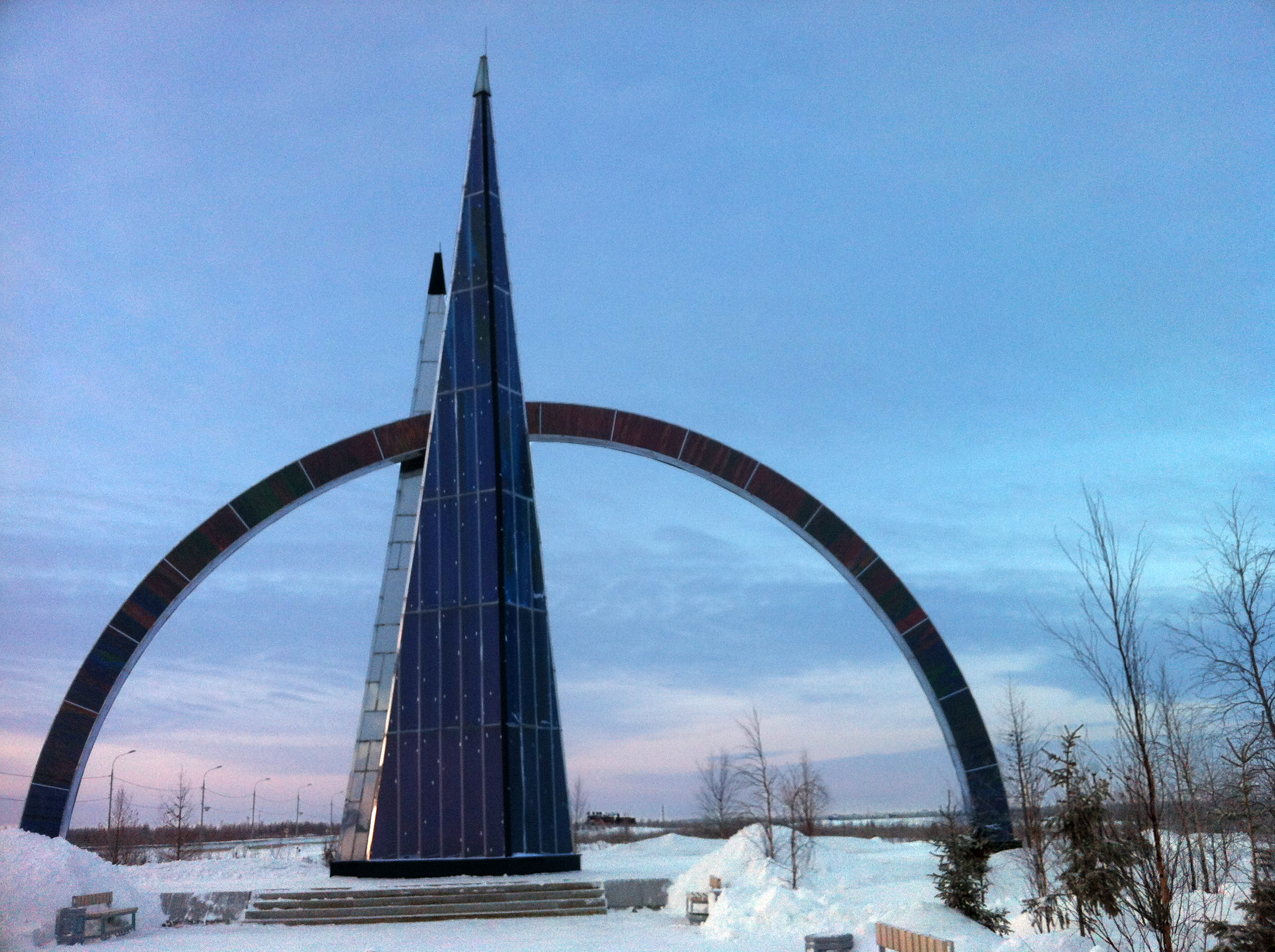
- Polar circle monument in Salekhard

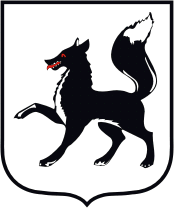
- Flag Coat of arms
- Interactive map of Salekhard
- Location of Salekhard Salekhard (Yamalo-Nenets Autonomous Okrug)
- Coordinates: 66°32′N 66°36′E
- Country: Russia
- Federal subject: Yamalo-Nenets Autonomous Okrug
- Founded: 1595
- Town status since: 1938

Government
  - Mayor: Alexey Titovsky

Area
  - Total: 84.50 km^{2} (32.63 sq mi)
- Elevation: 15 m (49 ft)

Population (2010 Census)
  - Total: 42,544
  - Estimate (2018): 49,214 (+15.7%)
  - Density: 503.5/km^{2} (1,304/sq mi)

Administrative status
  - Subordinated to: town of okrug significance of Salekhard
  - Capital of: Yamalo-Nenets Autonomous Okrug, town of okrug significance of Salekhard

Municipal status
  - Urban okrug: Salekhard Urban Okrug
  - Capital of: Salekhard Urban Okrug
- Time zone: UTC+5 (MSK+2)
- Postal code: 629000
- Dialing code: +7 34922
- OKTMO ID: 71951000001
- Website: www.salekhard.org

Salekhard (Russian: Салеха́рд [səlʲɪˈxart]; Khanty: Пуӆңават, Pułñawat; Nenets: Саляʼ харад, Saljaꜧ harad, formerly Obdorsk) is a town and the administrative centre of Yamalo-Nenets Autonomous Okrug, Russia. The town lies on the Arctic Circle, with the town centre being about 1 kilometer (0.62 mi) south and suburbs stretching to the north of the circle. The population is 47,910 (2021 census).

== History ==
The settlement of Obdorsk (Обдорск) was founded in 1595, in the place of a Khanty settlement called Polnovat-Vozh (Полноват-вож), by Russian settlers after the conquest of Siberia. It was situated on the Ob River, and its name supposedly derives from that. The land around Obdorsk was referred to as Obdorsky krai, or Obdoriya.

The town was often used as a place of exile during the Tsarist and Soviet periods. Among notable people who spent time here were the Doukhobor spiritual leader Pyotr Verigin and Leon Trotsky. At the port of Salekhard, approximately 1,500 prisoners were used as slave labor, loading and unloading goods at the dock, or mining metal ore. About 5,000 prisoners in two camps near Salekhard were forced to polish diamonds mined from Mir mine.

The nearest railway station is at Labytnangi on the opposite side of the river Ob. From 1949 to 1953, the Salekhard-Igarka Railway project made an unsuccessful attempt to extend the line to Igarka, claiming the lives of thousands of Gulag prisoners. The section of railway from Salekhard to Nadym was completed and remained in use for some time in the Soviet era, although it was later abandoned. It is currently being rebuilt, along with a long-awaited bridge across the Ob between Labytnangi and Salekhard.

Salekhard was the host city for the 2006 Arctic Council Ministerial Meeting in October 2006.

In April 2014, Rostelecom, a Russian Internet service provider, completed the final stretch of the Nadym-Salekhard optical Internet line, which stretches for almost 3,500 kilometres (2,200 mi).

In the Summer of 2016, temperatures as high as 95 °F (35 °C) thawed anthrax-infected corpses that had been frozen since the Soviet era near Salekhard, causing anthrax spores to infect reindeer herds and herders.

== Administrative and municipal status ==
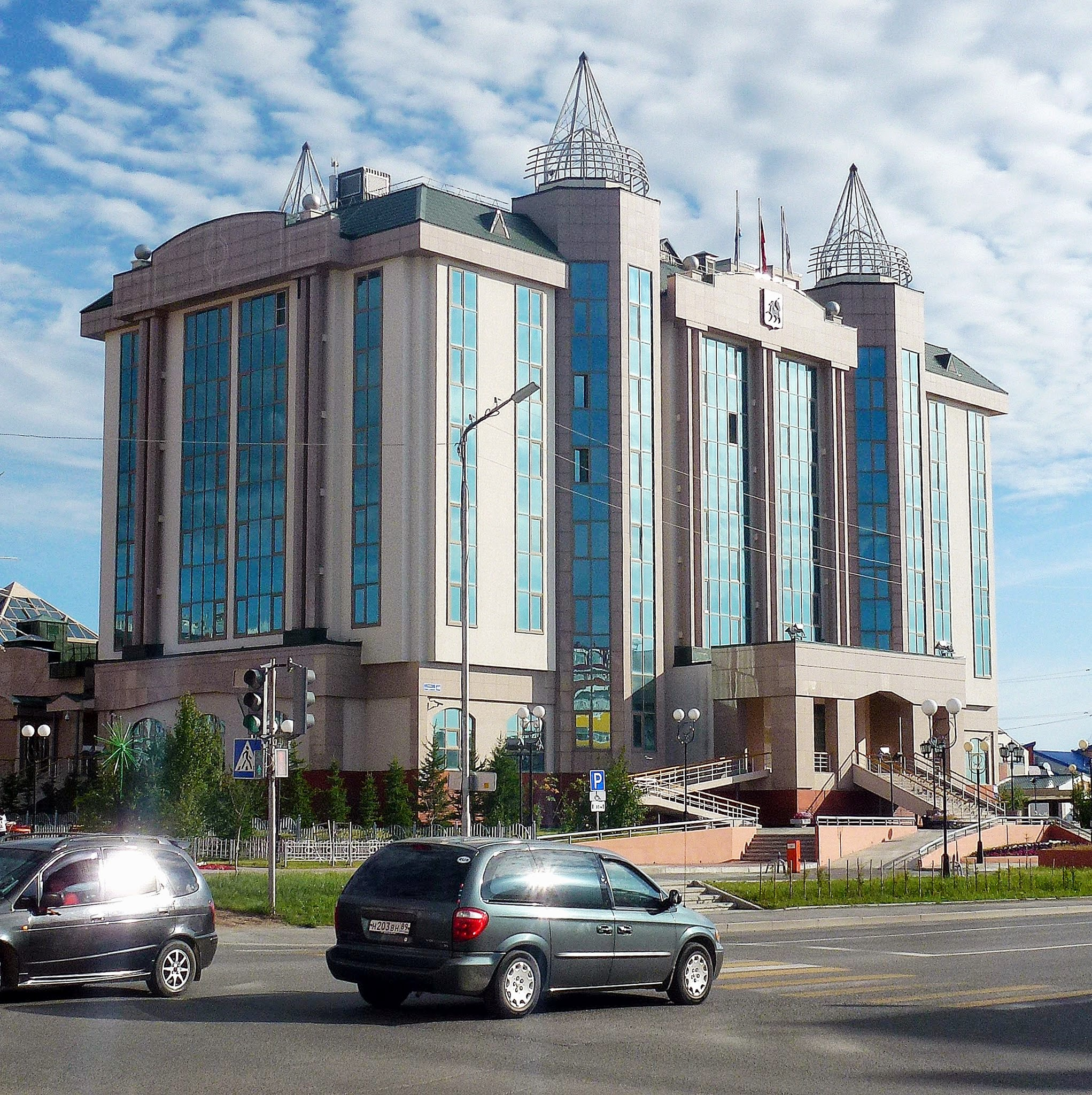
Administrative unit of Salekhard

Within the framework of administrative divisions, it is, together with one rural locality, incorporated as the town of okrug significance of Salekhard—an administrative unit with the status equal to that of the districts. As a municipal division, the town of okrug significance of Salekhard is incorporated as Salekhard Urban Okrug.

== Demographics ==
As of 2021, the ethnic composition of Salekhard was:

- Russians – 66.3%
- Tatars – 7.1%
- Khanty – 3.8%
- Ukrainians – 3.7%
- Nenets – 3.7%
- Komi – 2.0%
- Kyrgyz – 1.4%
- Others – 12%
  Historical population
  Year	Pop.	±%
  1897	1,249	—
  1926	1,872	+49.9%
  1939	12,764	+581.8%
  1959	16,567	+29.8%
  1970	21,929	+32.4%
  1979	24,935	+13.7%
  1989	32,334	+29.7%
  2002	36,827	+13.9%
  2010	42,544	+15.5%
  2021	47,910	+12.6%
  Source: Census data

== Economy ==
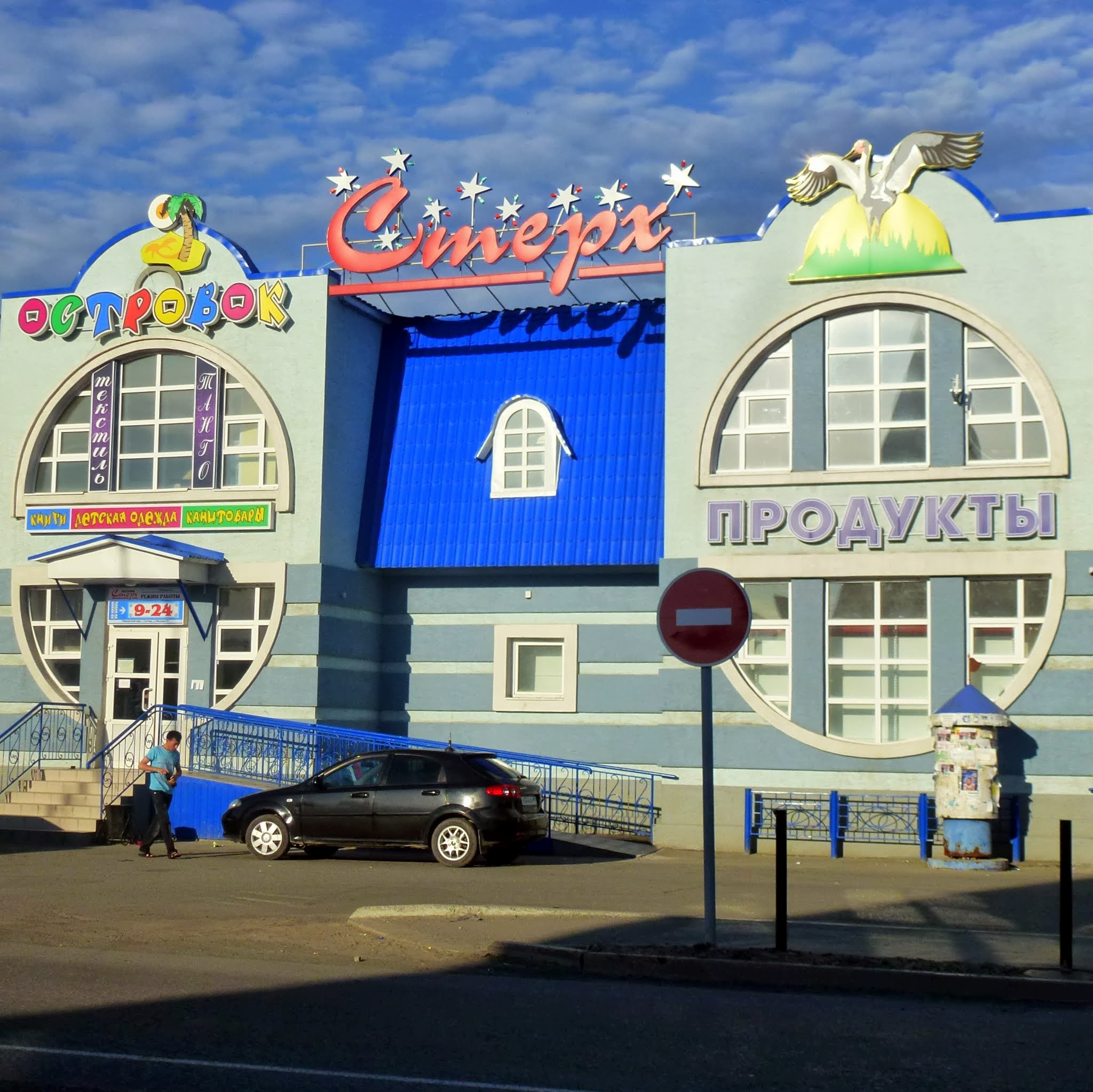
Sterh Supermarket

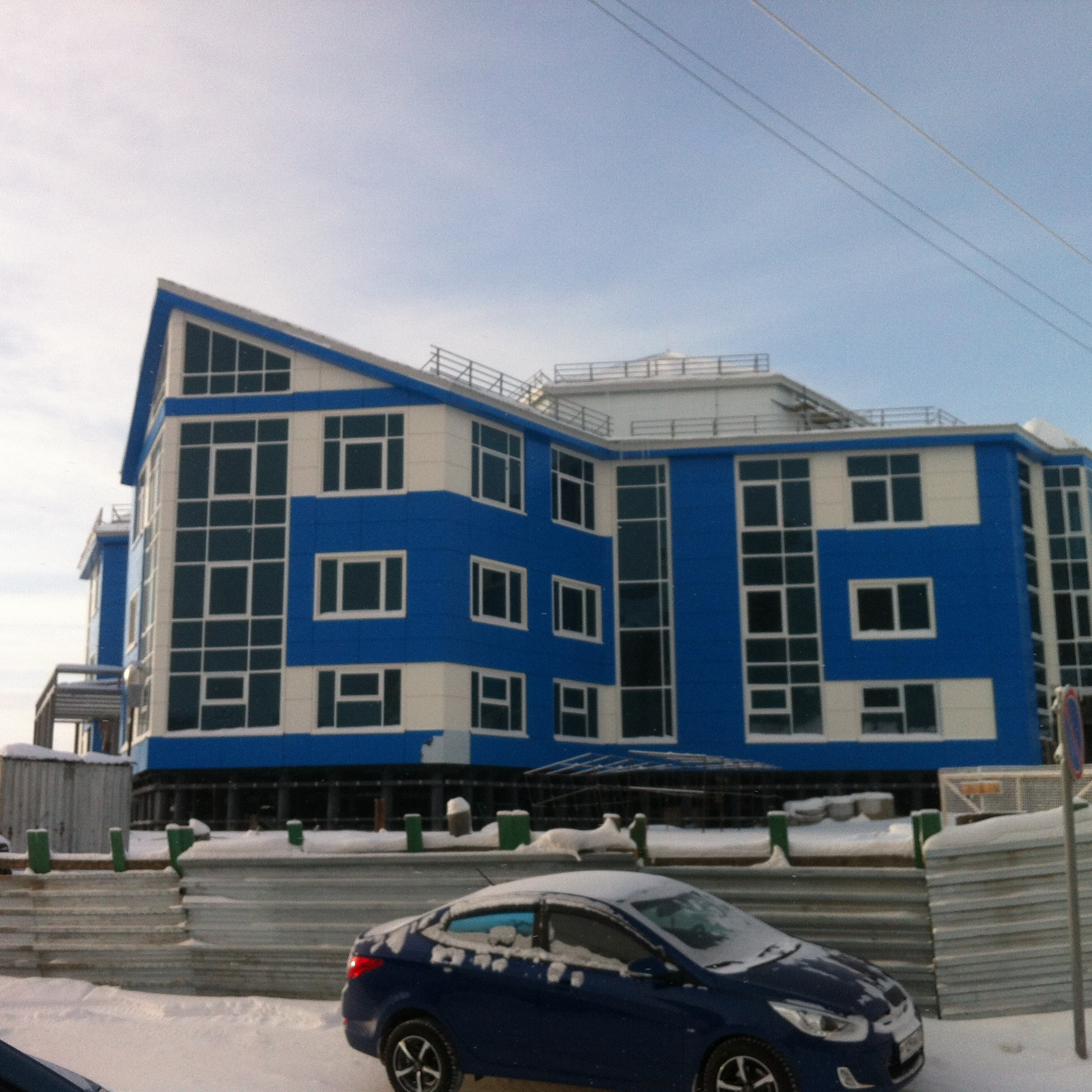
Building of the representative office of Gazprom

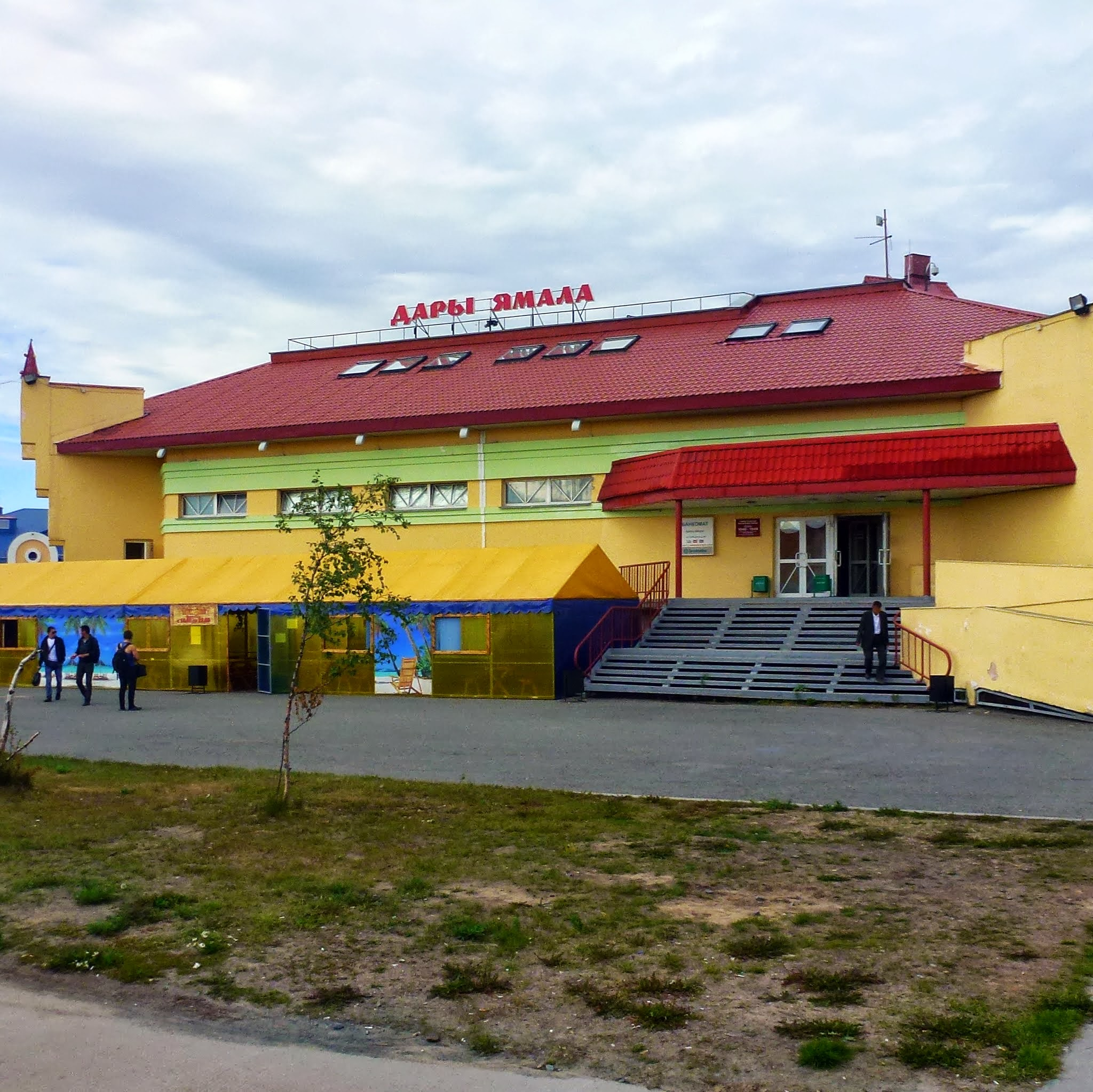
Gifts of Yamal Supermarket

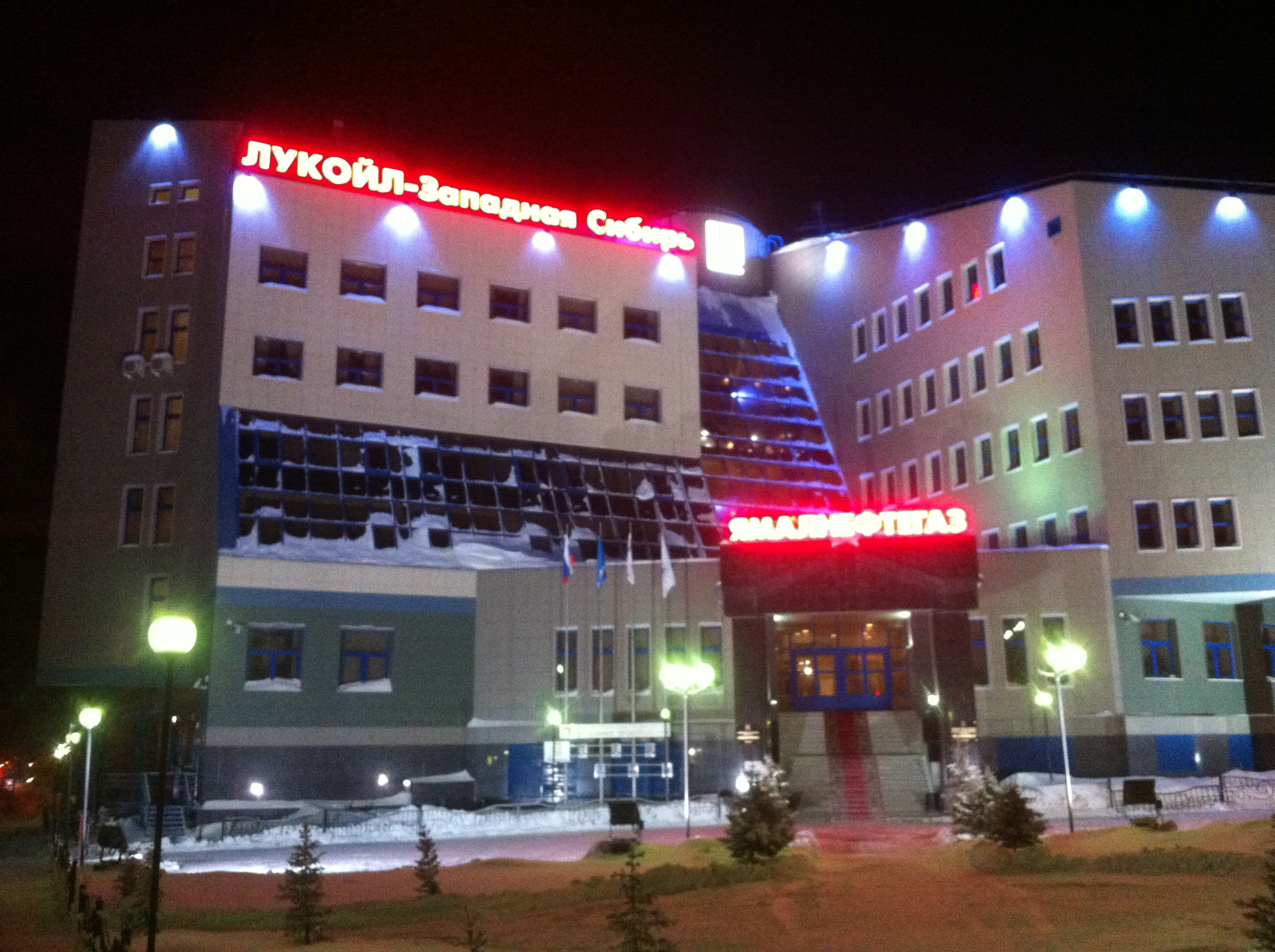
Headquarters of Yamalneftegaz

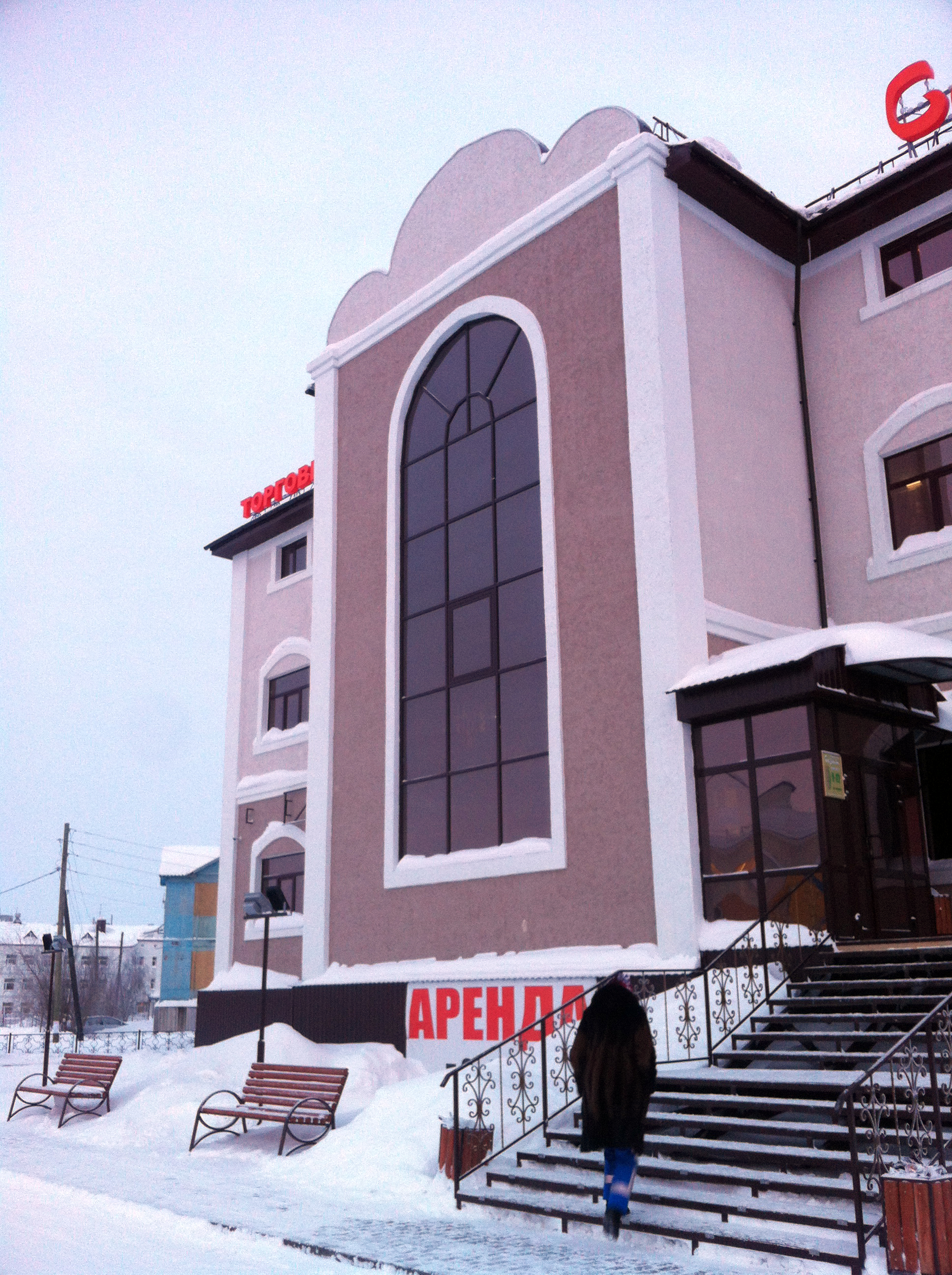
Sezam Shopping center

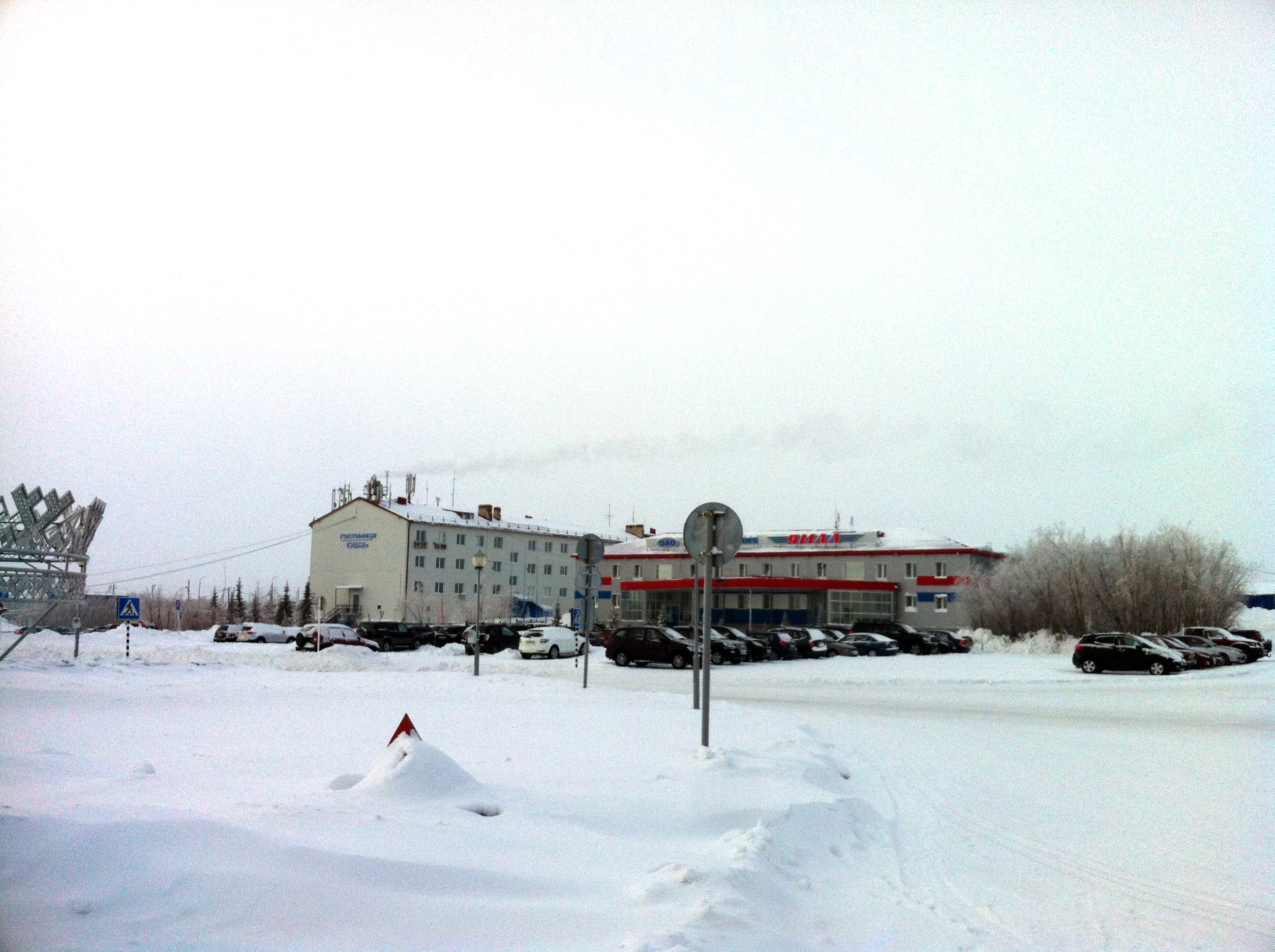
Yamal Airlines Headquarters

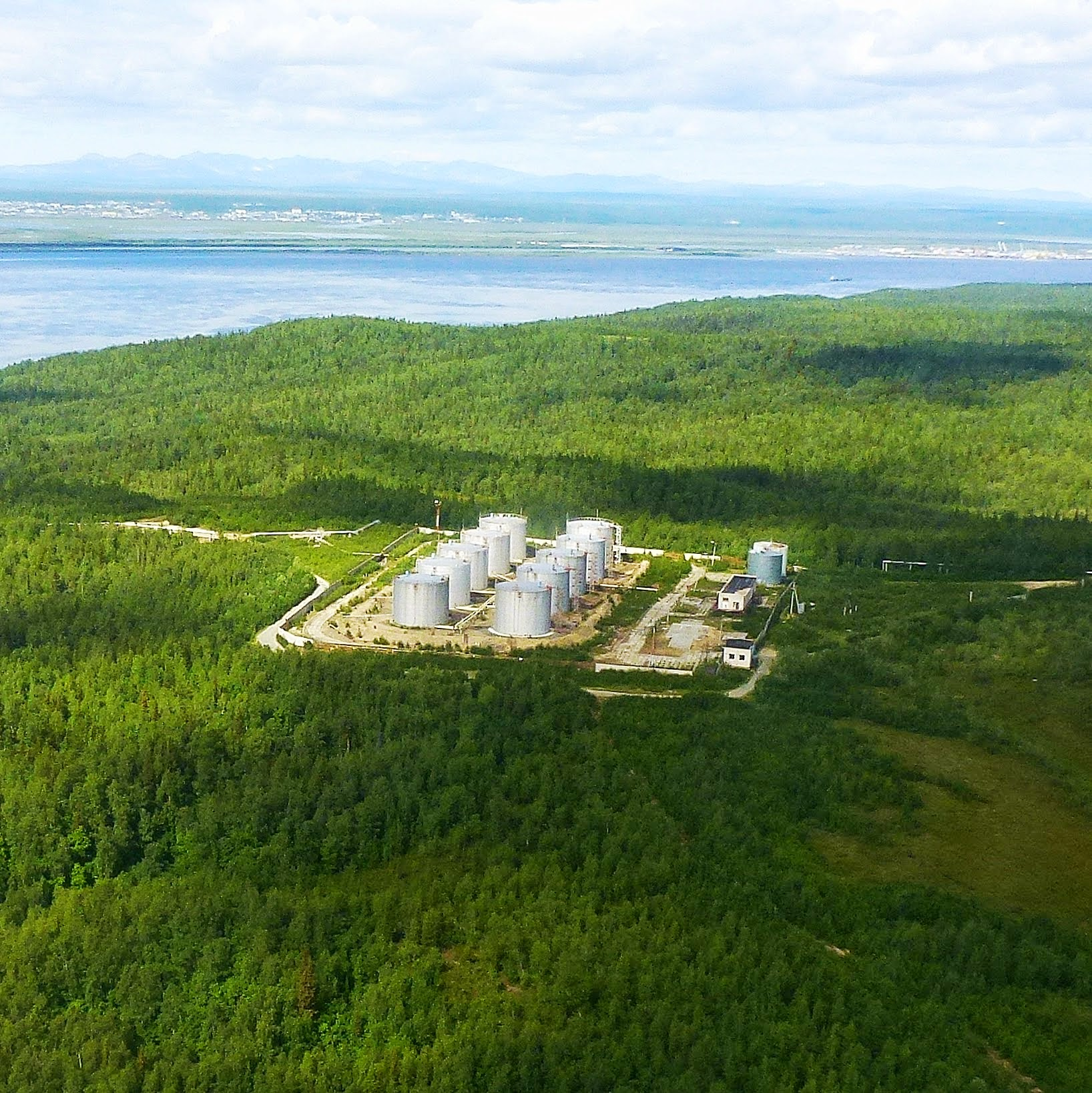
Oil depot

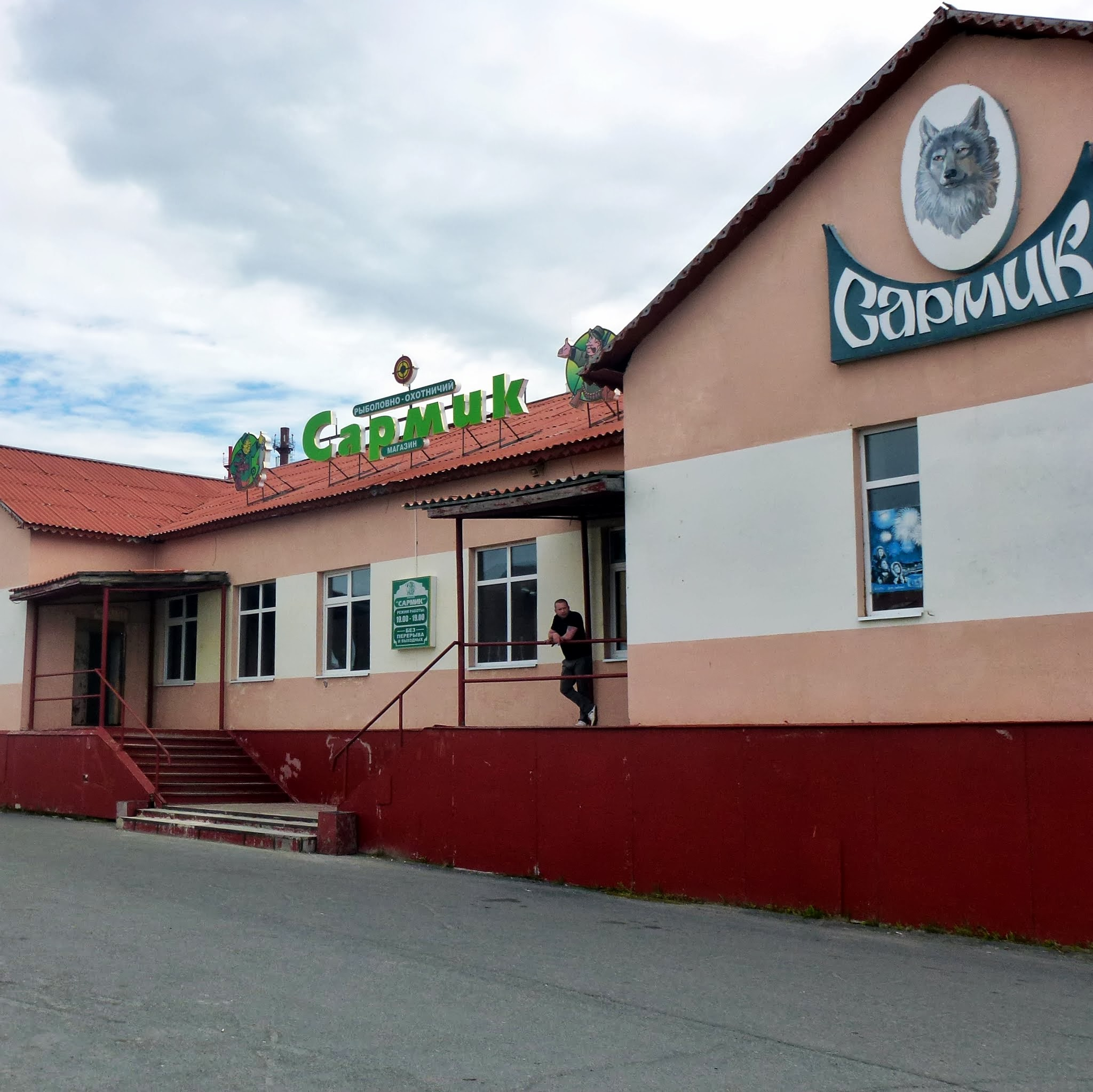
Sarmik Fishing and hunting shop

Yamal Airlines has its head office in Salekhard. Most of residents are employed in reindeer herding, fishing and the services sector.

By 2015, about 3 kilometres (1.9 miles) from the airport, near the Arctic Circle, authorities plan to build a large polar resort "Center of the Arctic tourism".

=== Transportation ===
Salekhard is located in the Ob river valley and is an important river port of the Russian Far North. The unfinished Salekhard–Igarka Railway was set to provide a rail connection between the Ob river port of Salekhard and the Yenisei river port of Igarka. Currently, the nearest railway is at Labytnangi, 20 kilometres (12 mi) northwest on the opposite side of the river Ob. The project Northern Latitudinal Railway will provide Salekhard access to Russian railway and will further connect Salekhard to the Konosha–Vorkuta railway and other parts of European Russia. The Salekhard Bridge project, a combined railway-road bridge over Ob river, is the main component of Northern Latitudinal Railway that will connect Labytnangi and Salekhard is to be constructed with the cost of 60 billion rubles. Nadym–Salekhard road, a 344 km long road, was inaugurated in December 2020 to the 90th anniversary of the Yamalo-Nenets Autonomous Okrug, it will facilitate the construction of a railway between the two cities and connects the eastern and western parts of Yamal Okrug. For 9–10 months each year, the Ob river is frozen and cars and trucks can drive across the river ice. In the summer a ferry operates, however during the floating of ice, generally shortly before the start and shortly after the end of summer, Salekhard is effectively isolated from the outside world, regarding freight. During these periods, only helicopters are able to reach Salekhard in case of emergency. Native people, mainly the Nenets and Khanty people, always build up stocks of food at home, in the shops, and in the markets during this period, but they still suffer from seasonal inflation. The city is also served by the Salekhard Airport, which is 7 kilometres (4.3 mi) north of the main city.

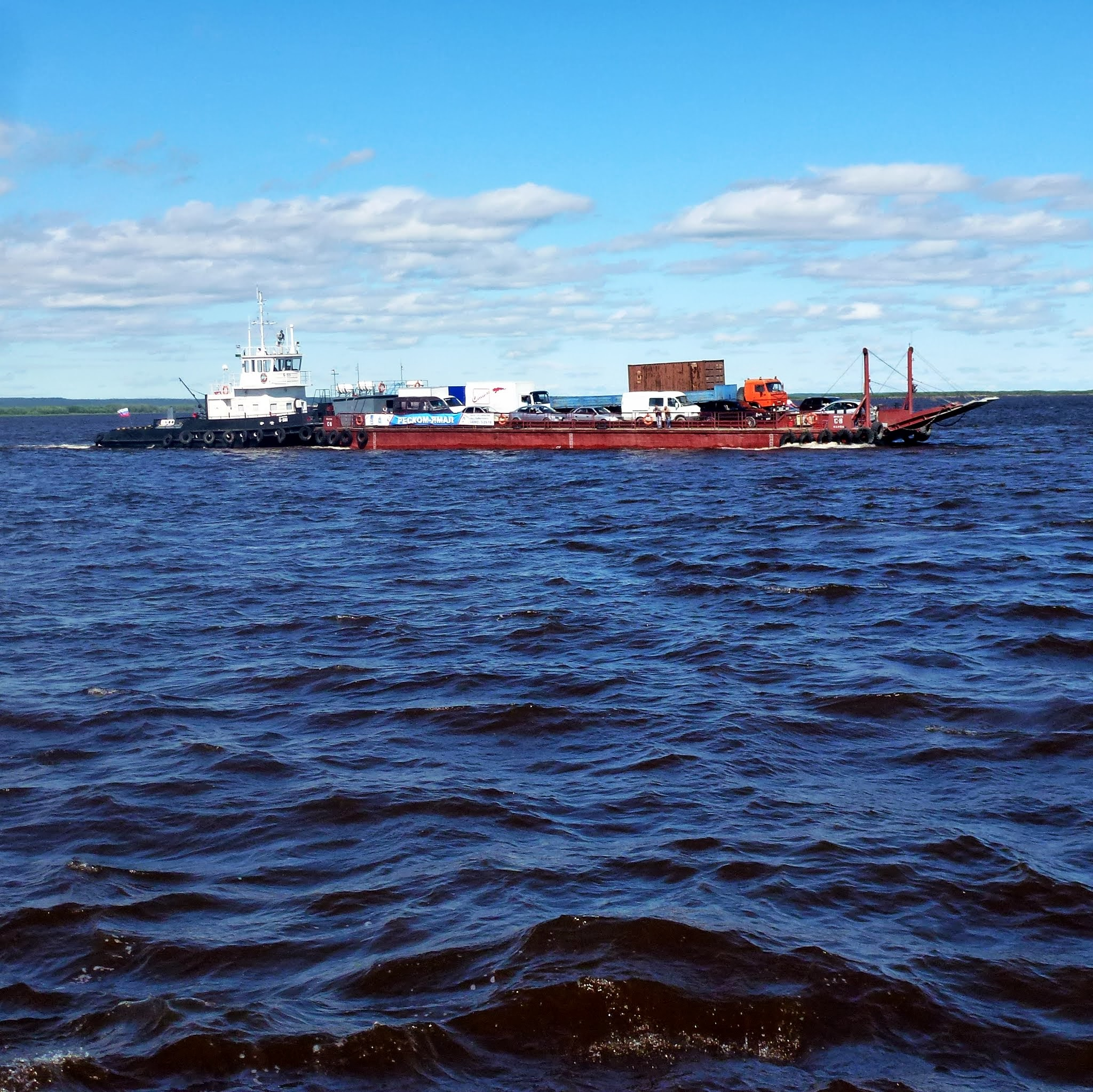
Ferry across the Ob river

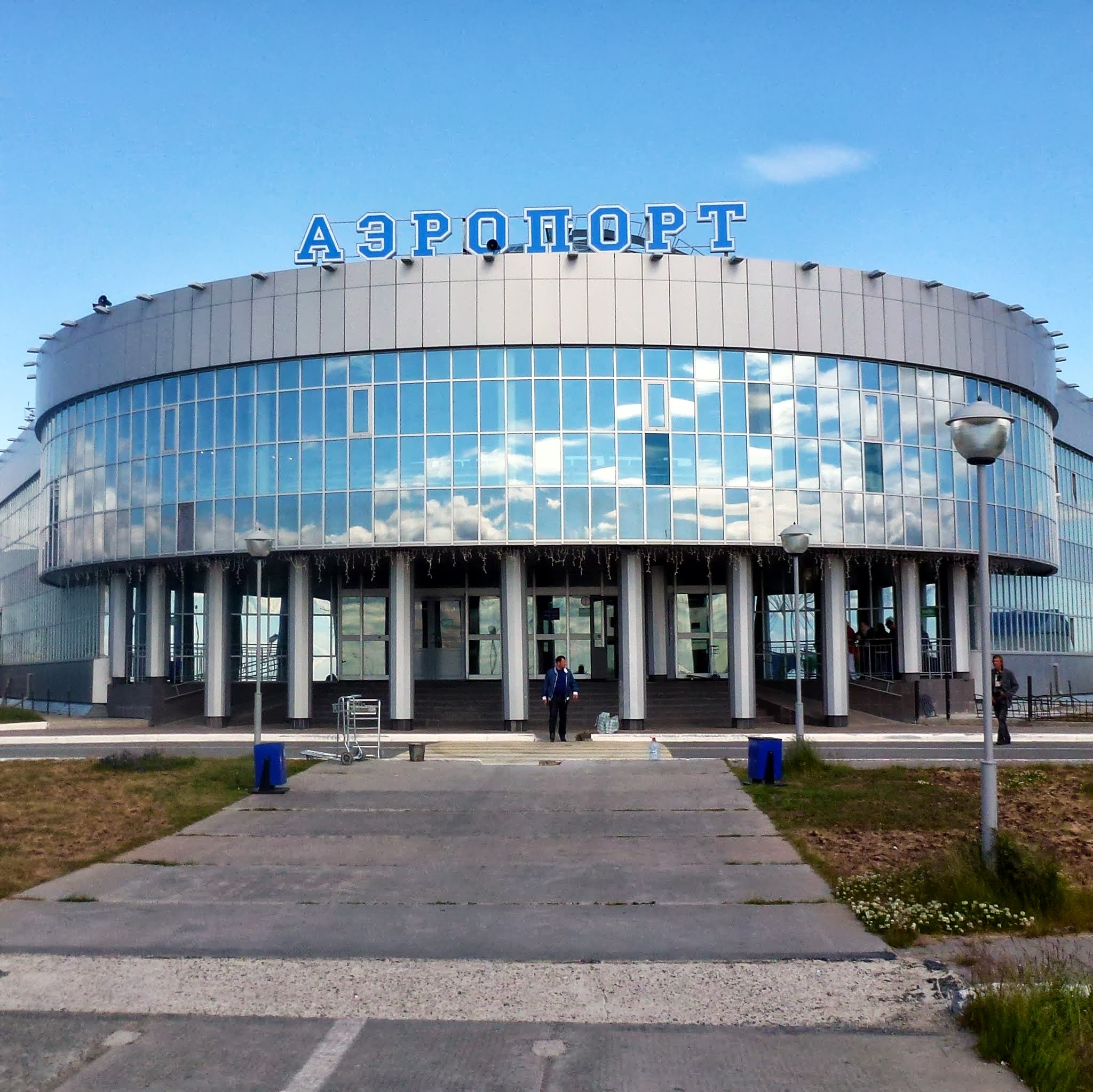
Salekhard Airport

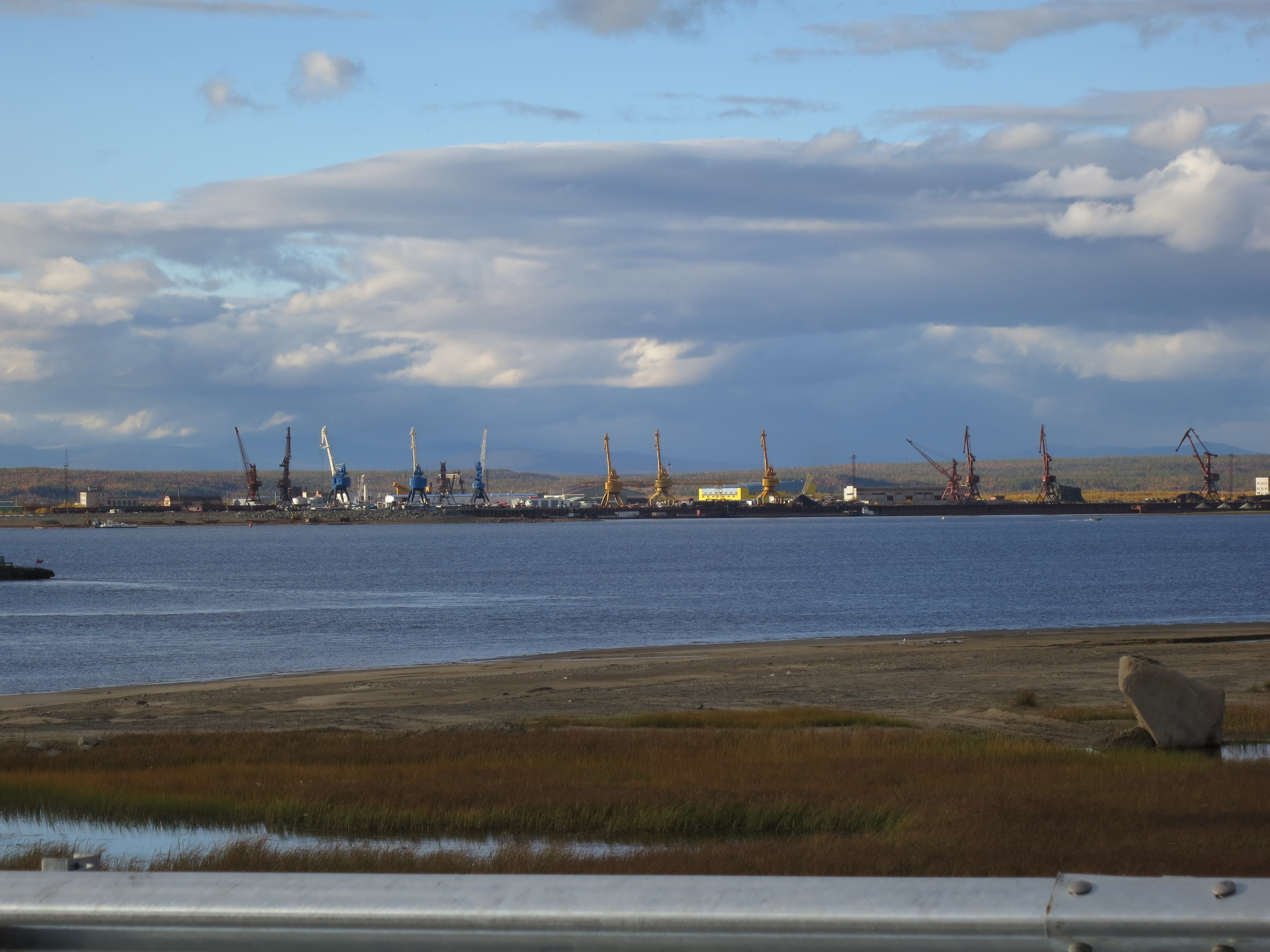
Salekhard port on Ob river

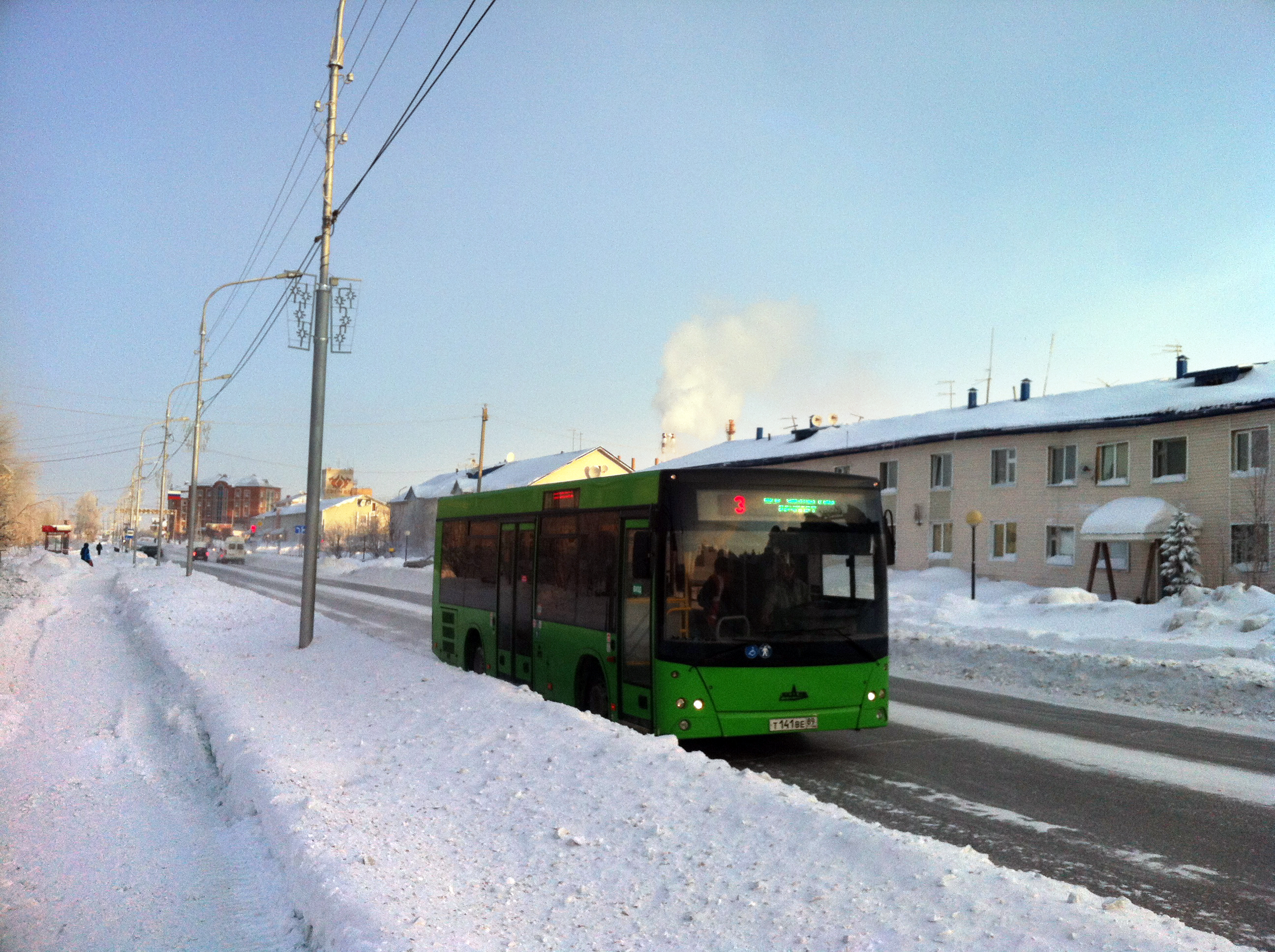
Bus transport

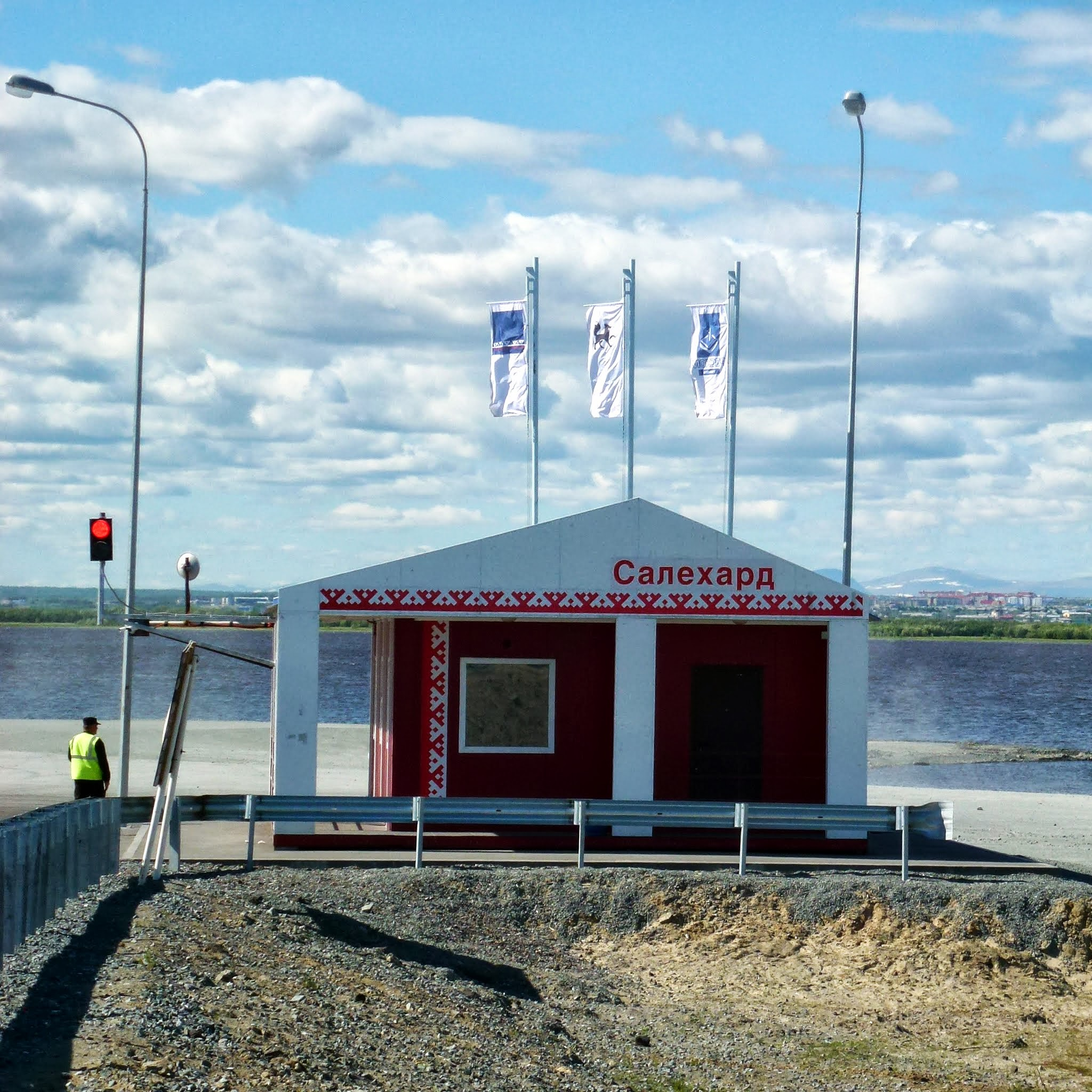
Ferry service station

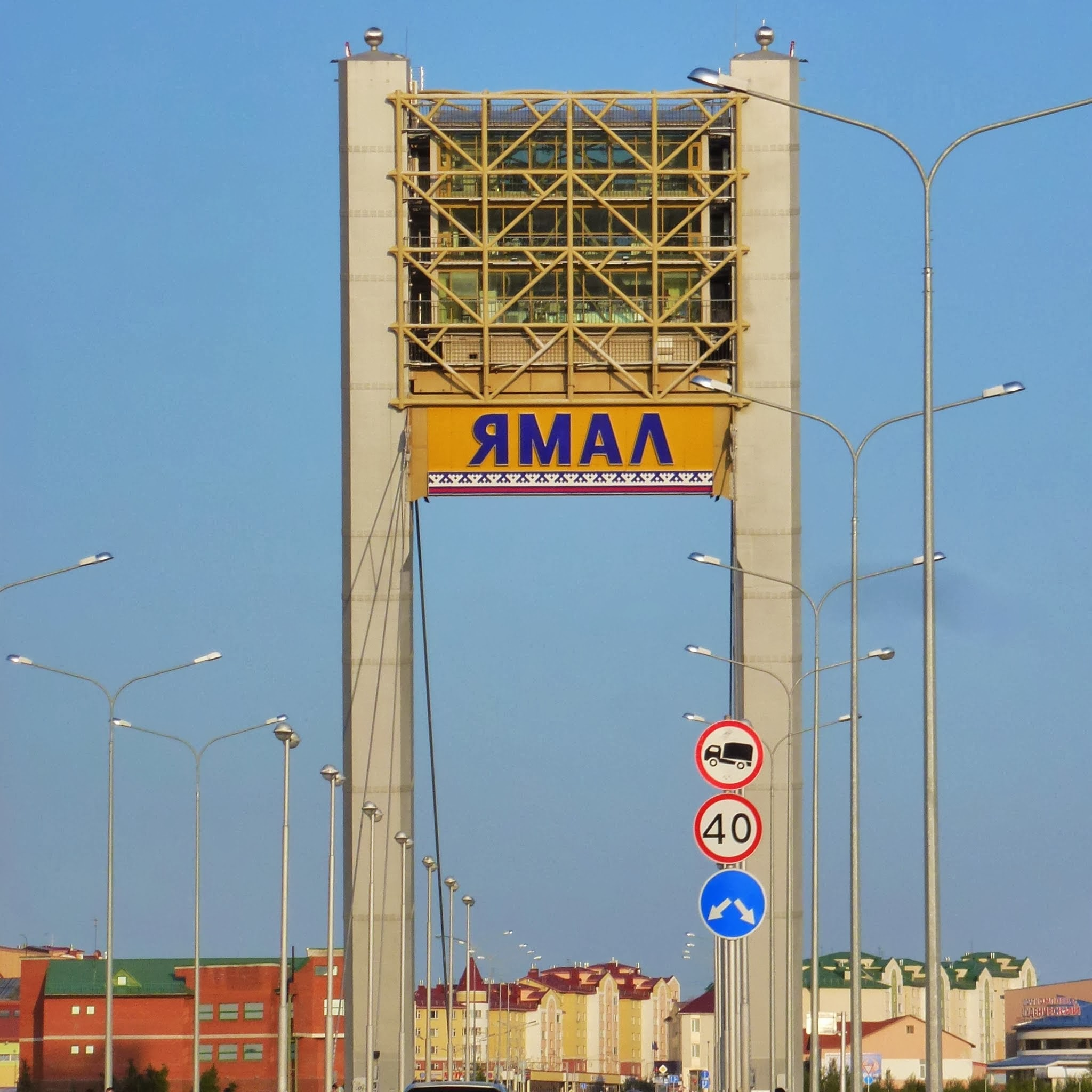
Fakel (Torch) Bridge over Poluy river

== Climate ==
Salekhard has a subarctic climate (Köppen climate classification Dfc) with short, mild summers and severely cold winters. Precipitation is moderate, and is significantly greater in summer than in winter. The "midnight sun" is above the horizon from 7 June to 6 July (30 days).

Climate data for Salekhard (1991–2020, extremes 1882–present)
Month	Jan	Feb	Mar	Apr	May	Jun	Jul	Aug	Sep	Oct	Nov	Dec	Year
Record high °C (°F)	3.5 (38.3)	3.3 (37.9)	7.3 (45.1)	15.5 (59.9)	28.4 (83.1)	31.6 (88.9)	32.9 (91.2)	30.4 (86.7)	24.8 (76.6)	18.2 (64.8)	7.0 (44.6)	4.1 (39.4)	32.9 (91.2)
Mean daily maximum °C (°F)	−18.8 (−1.8)	−17.7 (0.1)	−9.2 (15.4)	−2.3 (27.9)	4.7 (40.5)	15.2 (59.4)	20.0 (68.0)	15.9 (60.6)	9.3 (48.7)	0.2 (32.4)	−10.5 (13.1)	−15.6 (3.9)	−0.7 (30.7)
Daily mean °C (°F)	−23.1 (−9.6)	−22 (−8)	−14.2 (6.4)	−7.3 (18.9)	0.4 (32.7)	10.3 (50.5)	15.0 (59.0)	11.6 (52.9)	5.7 (42.3)	−2.7 (27.1)	−14.5 (5.9)	−19.9 (−3.8)	−5.1 (22.8)
Mean daily minimum °C (°F)	−27.7 (−17.9)	−26.6 (−15.9)	−19.3 (−2.7)	−12.1 (10.2)	−3.5 (25.7)	5.8 (42.4)	9.9 (49.8)	7.3 (45.1)	2.4 (36.3)	−5.8 (21.6)	−18.9 (−2.0)	−24.3 (−11.7)	−9.4 (15.1)
Record low °C (°F)	−51.9 (−61.4)	−53.7 (−64.7)	−47.4 (−53.3)	−38.7 (−37.7)	−30.8 (−23.4)	−11 (12)	−1 (30)	−5.5 (22.1)	−10 (14)	−35.7 (−32.3)	−47.1 (−52.8)	−51.5 (−60.7)	−53.7 (−64.7)
Average precipitation mm (inches)	24 (0.9)	21 (0.8)	23 (0.9)	28 (1.1)	44 (1.7)	57 (2.2)	61 (2.4)	67 (2.6)	46 (1.8)	48 (1.9)	31 (1.2)	26 (1.0)	476 (18.7)
Average extreme snow depth cm (inches)	36 (14)	40 (16)	45 (18)	36 (14)	17 (6.7)	0 (0)	0 (0)	0 (0)	0 (0)	5 (2.0)	20 (7.9)	30 (12)	45 (18)
Average rainy days	0	0	1	3	10	17	18	20	20	9	1	0	99
Average snowy days	26	25	23	18	17	4	0.03	0.2	5	21	25	27	191
Average relative humidity (%)	83	82	81	78	77	70	72	79	82	86	85	83	80
Mean monthly sunshine hours	4	48	135	209	233	270	307	185	96	57	18	0	1,562
Source 1: Pogoda.ru.net
Source 2: NOAA (sun only, 1961-1990)

== Gallery ==
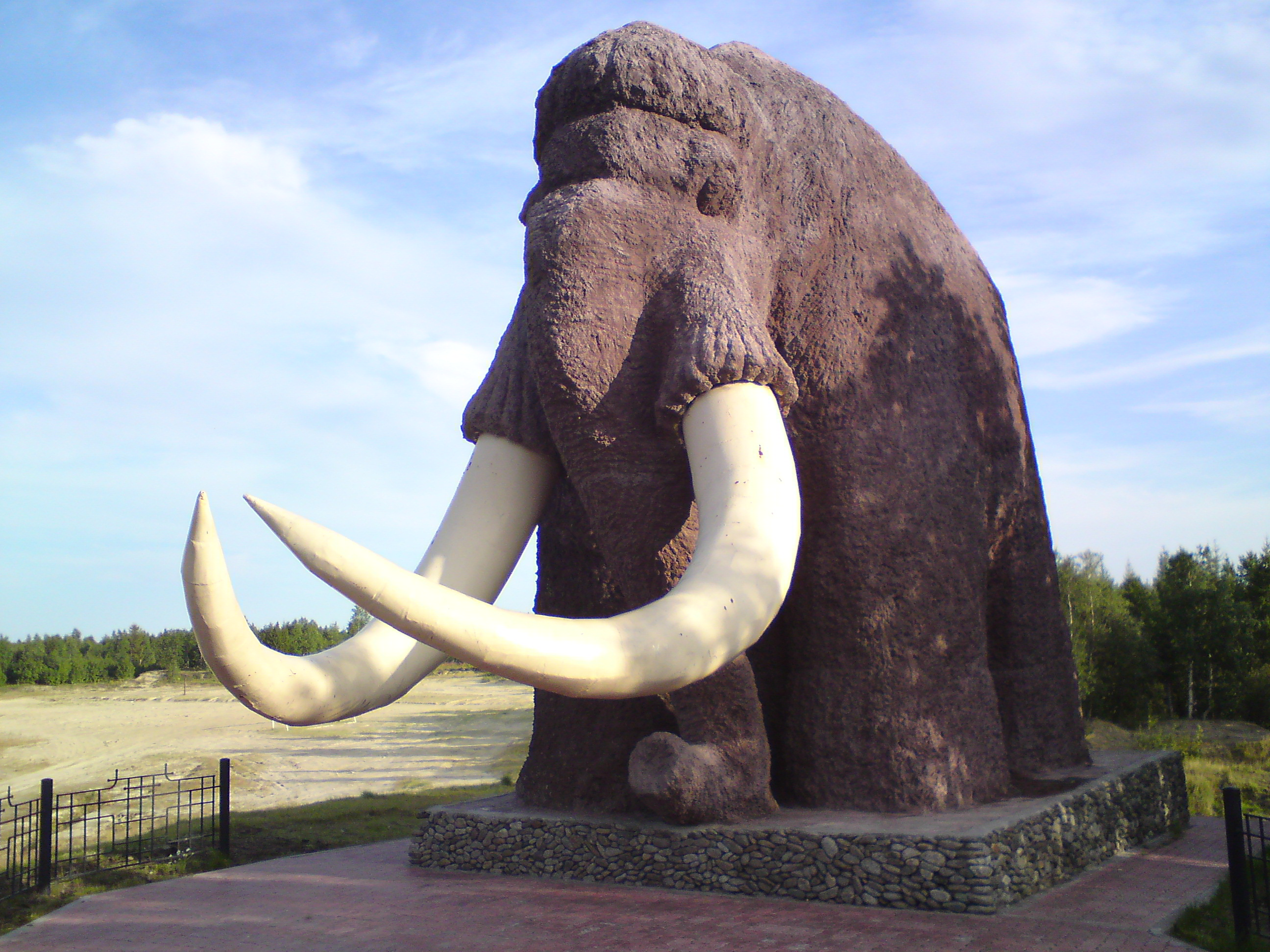
Mammoth monument in Salekhard

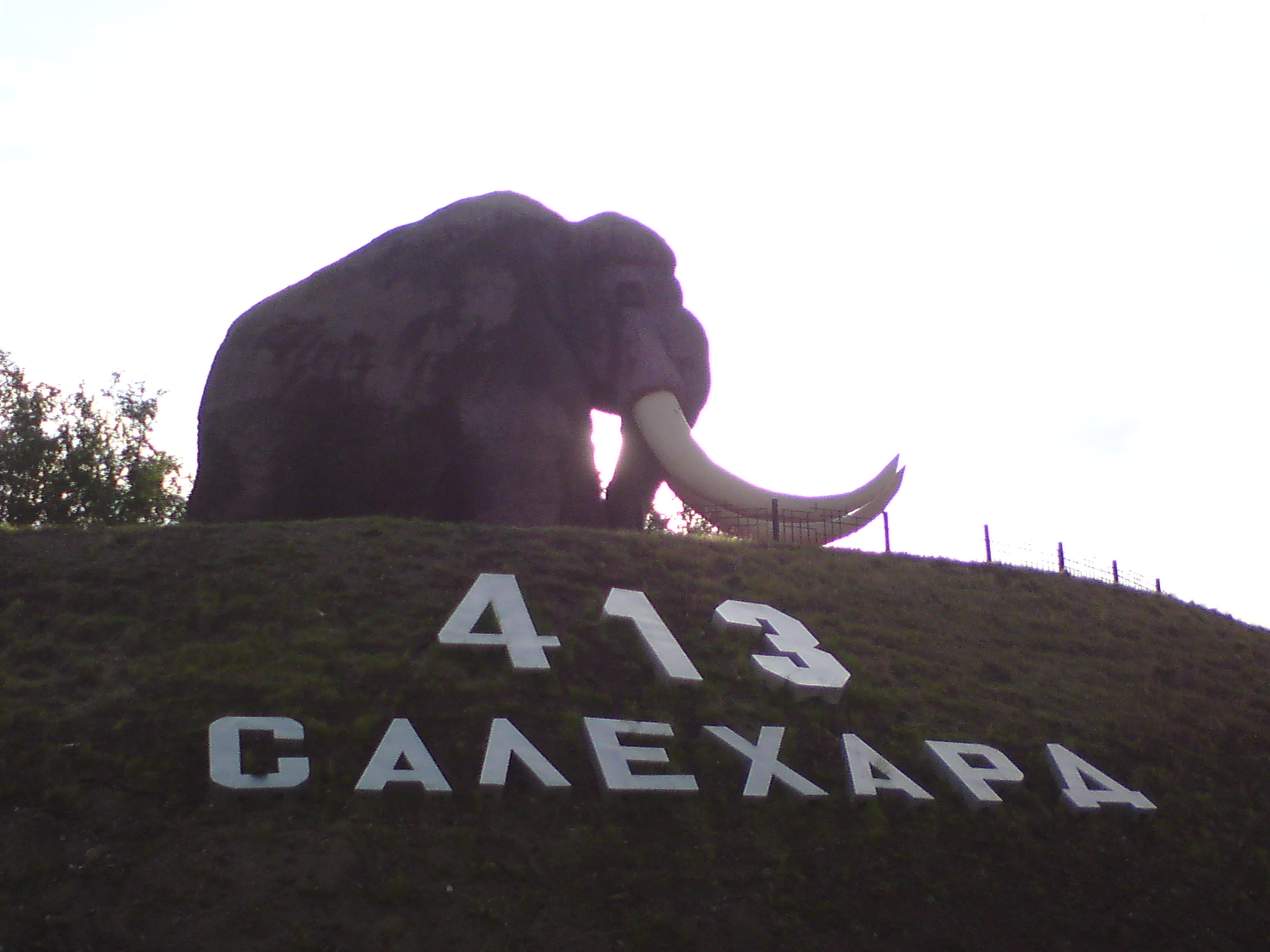
Mammoth monument

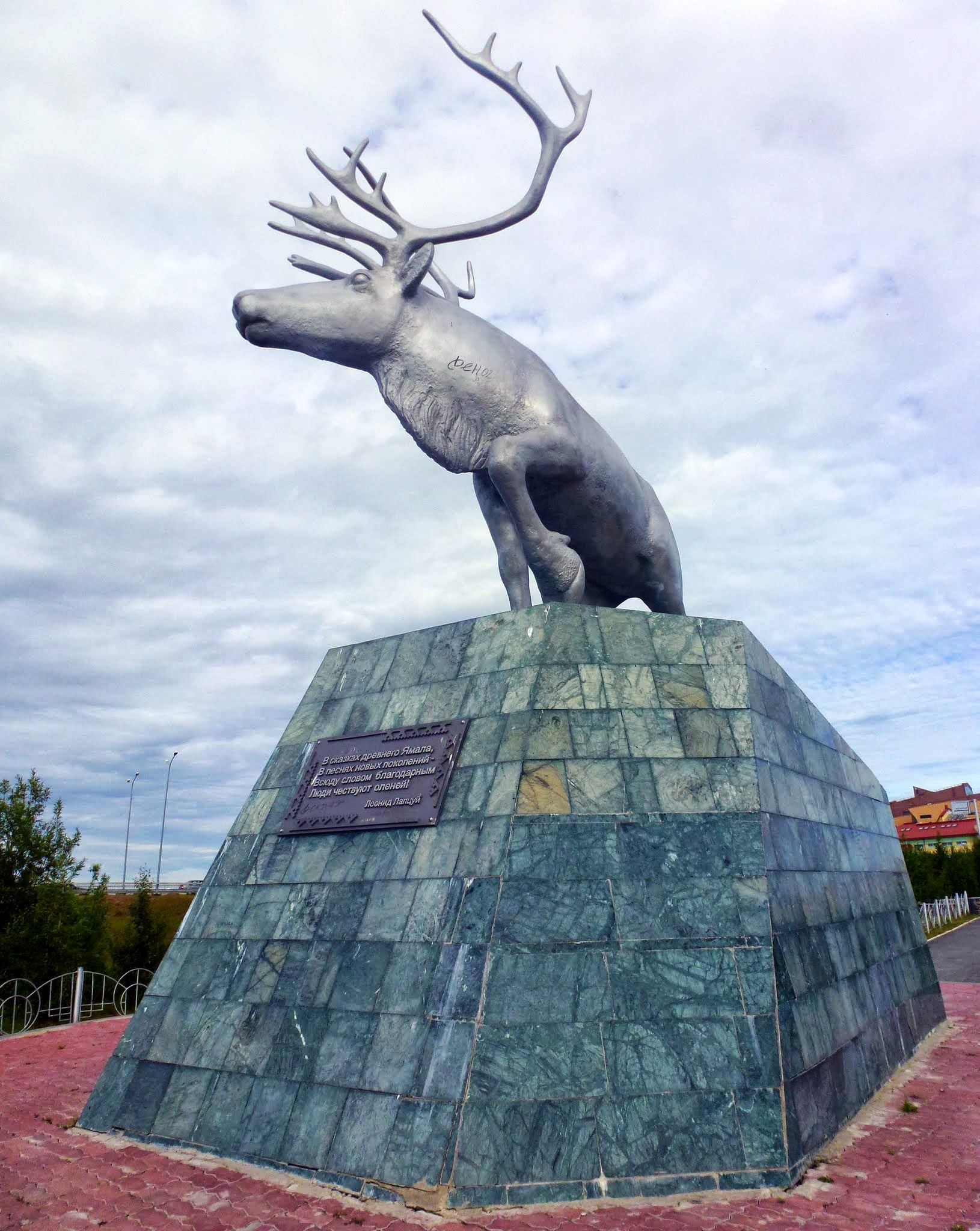
Reindeer monument in Salekhard

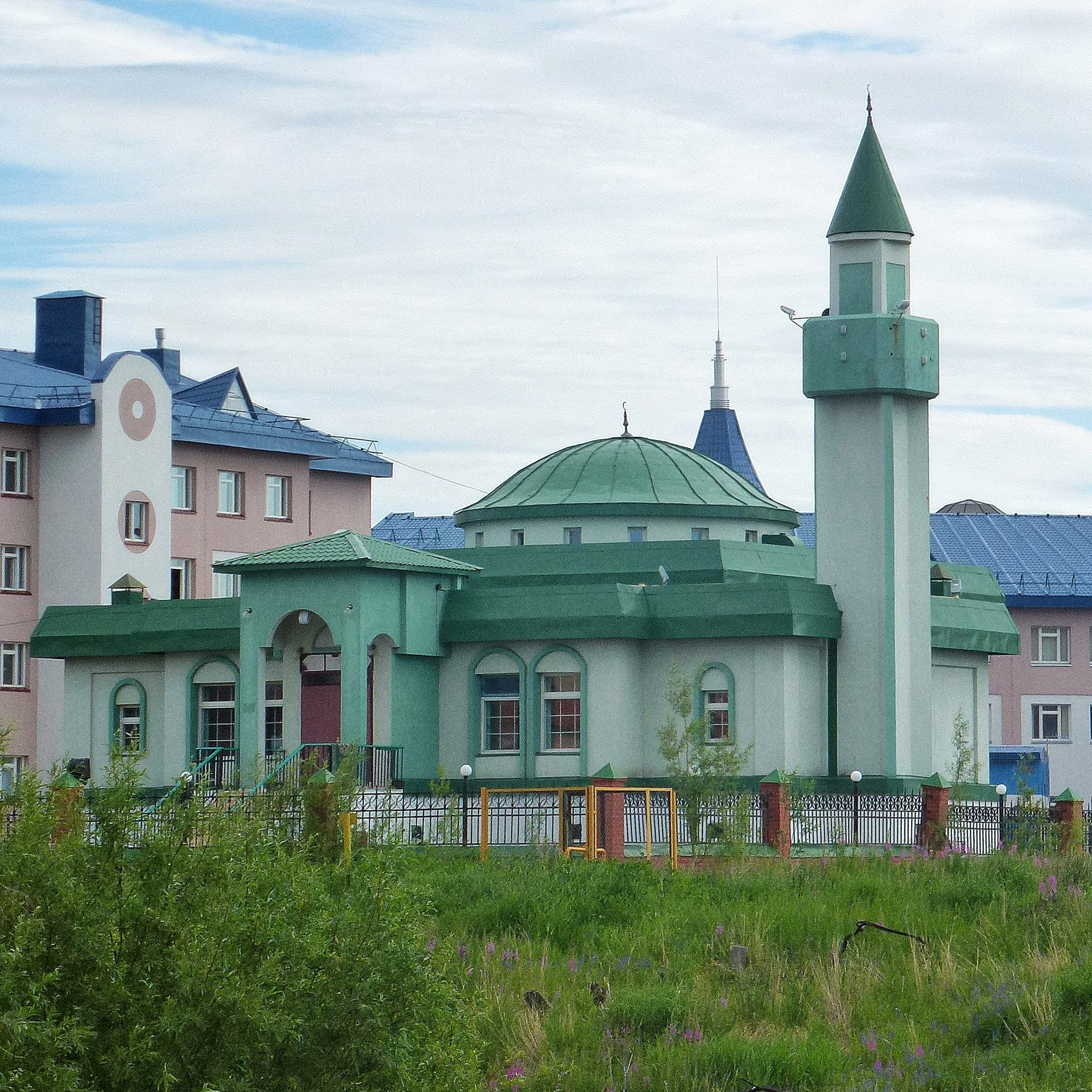
Mosque in Salekhard

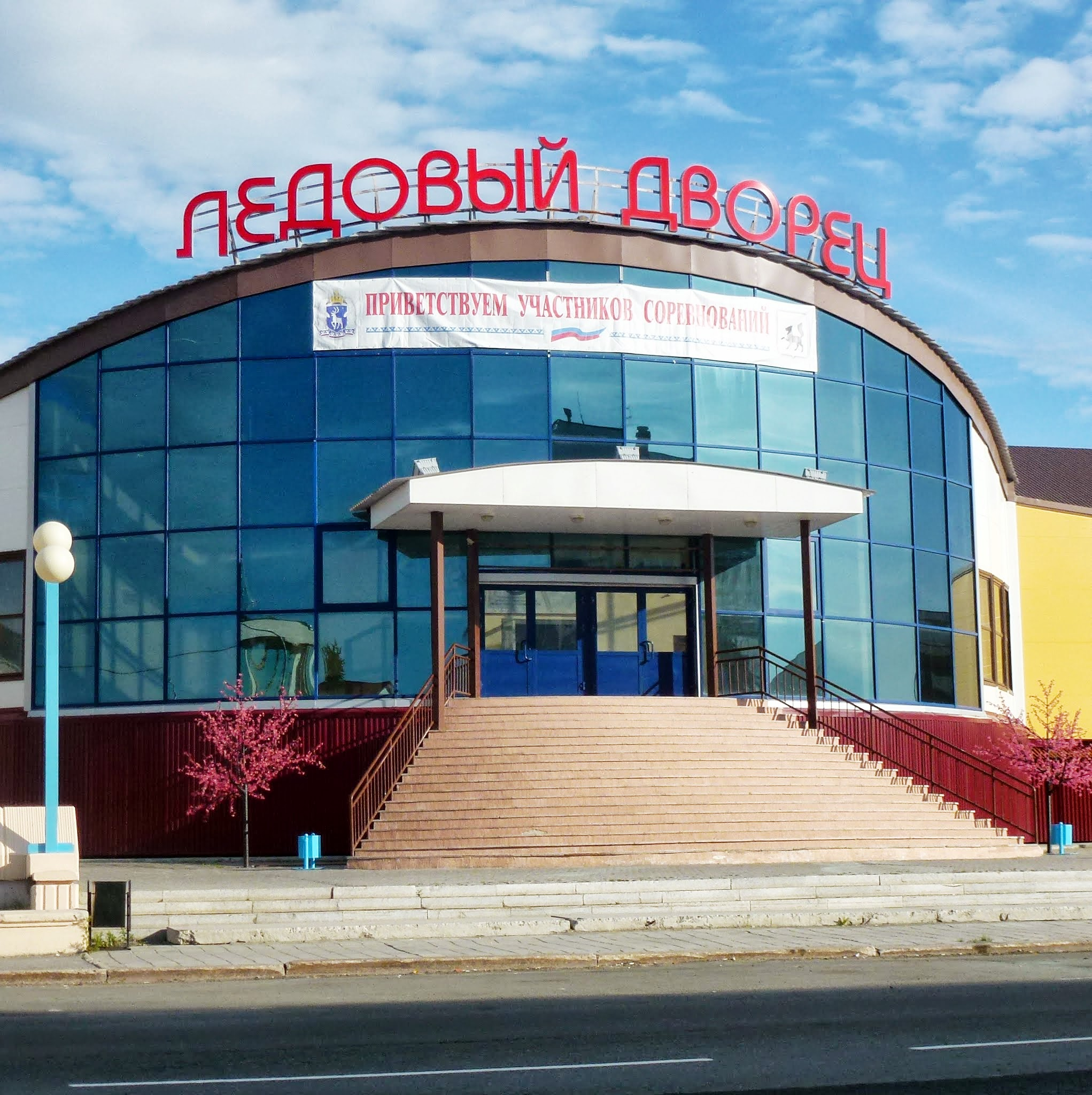
Ice Palace of Salekhard

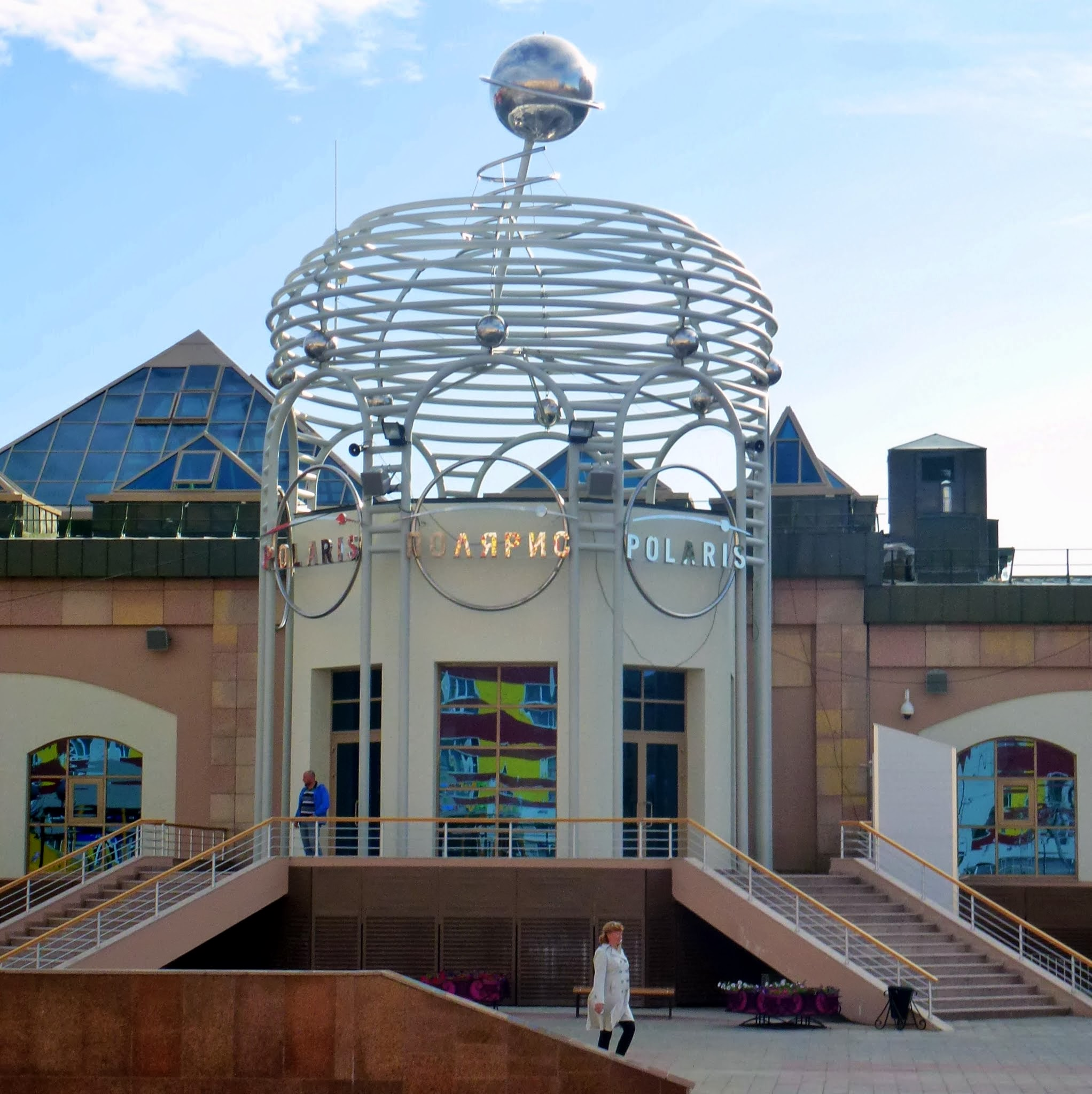
Polyaris Entertainment center

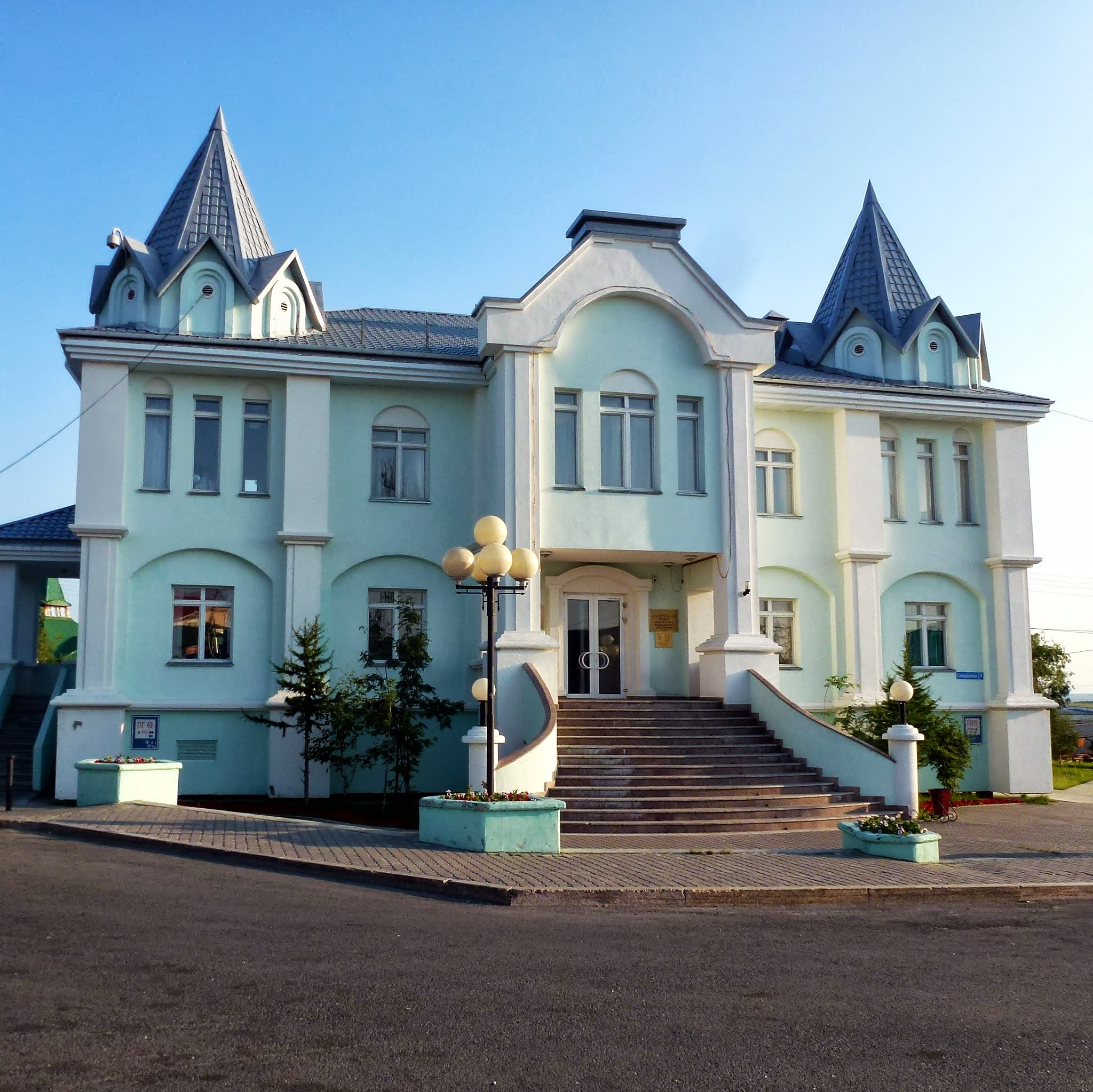
Wedding Palace

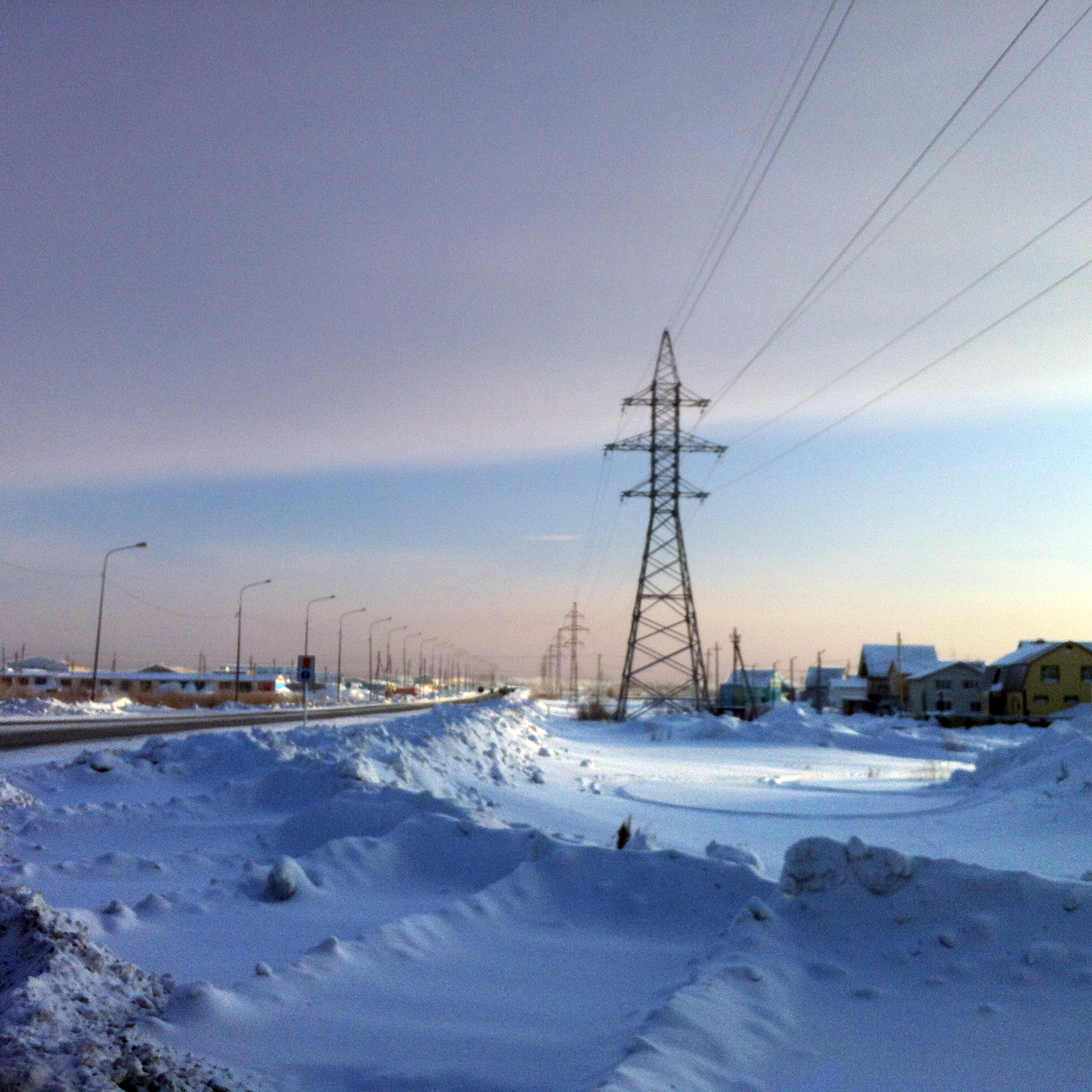
Northern outskirts of Salekhard

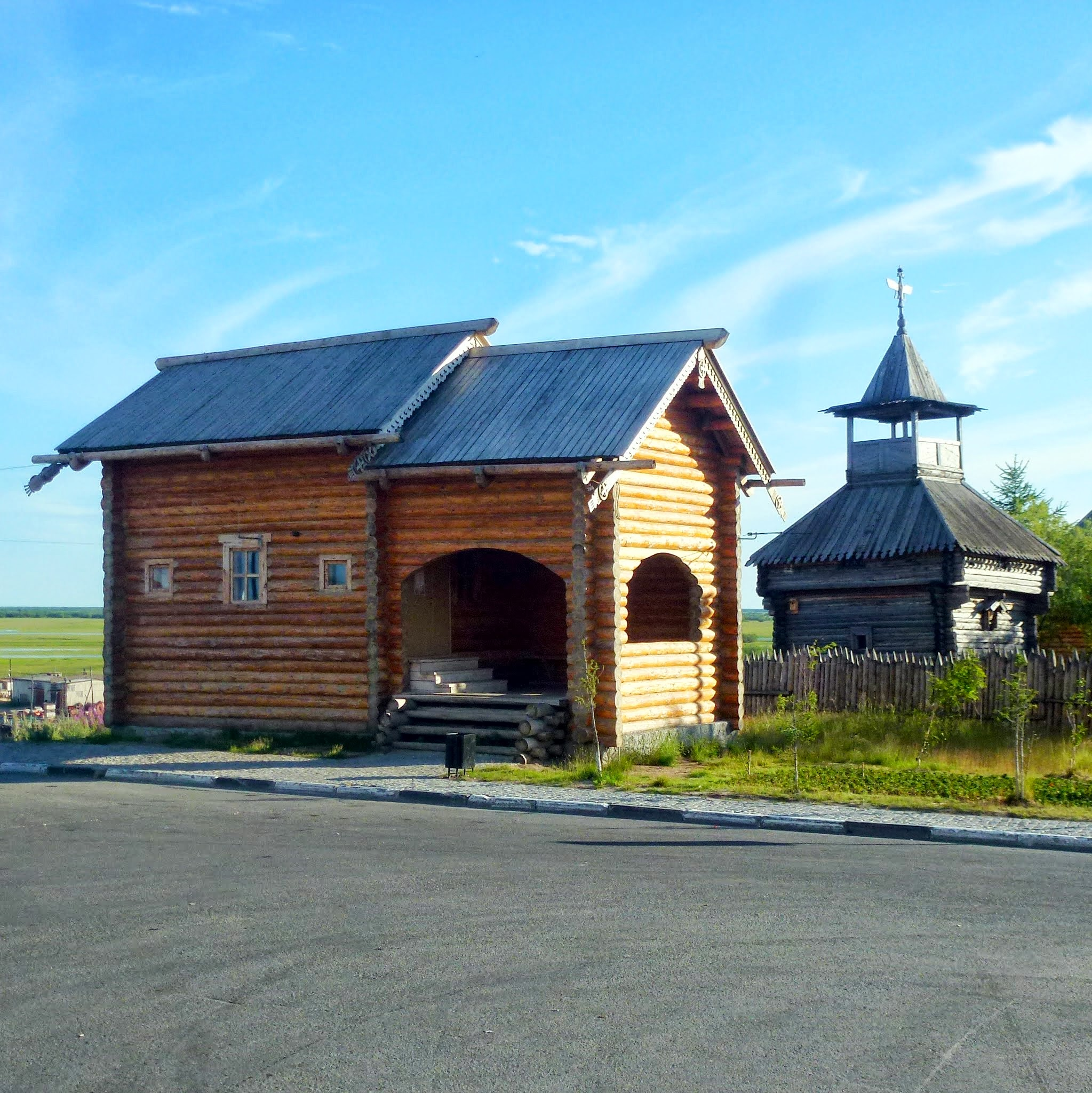
"Craftsmen Village"

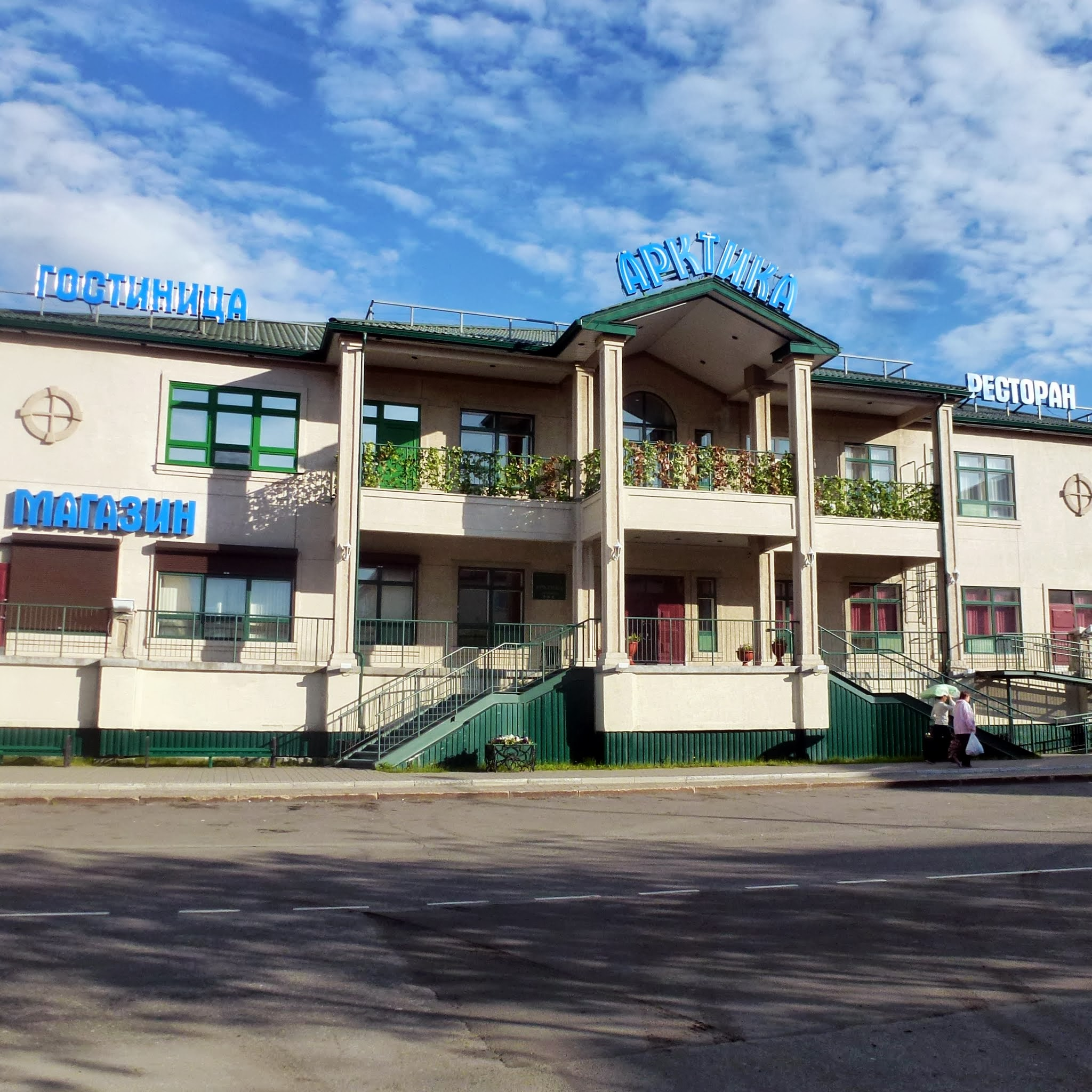
Arctic Hotel

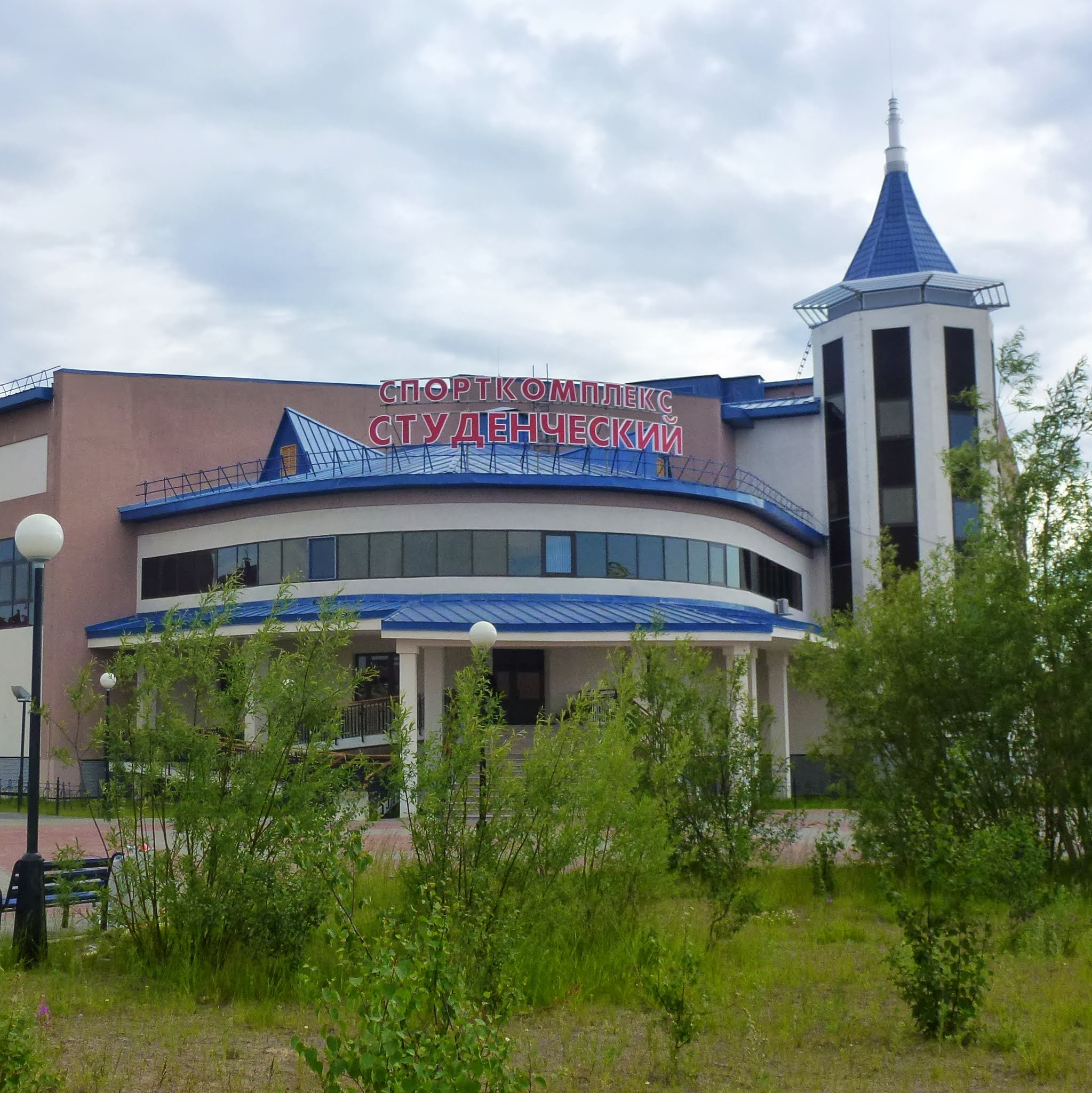
Students sports complex

== International relations ==
=== Twin Town & Sister City ===
Salekhard is twinned with:

- Azov, Rostov Oblast, Russia

== Notable people ==
- Ion-Georgy Kostev (born 1990), professional ice hockey player
