= Baraban, Perm Krai =

Baraban Барабан
- Village
- Location within Perm Krai Location within Russia
- Coordinates: 56°21′N 55°16′E
- Country: Russia
- Region: Perm Krai
- District: Kuyedinsky District
- Time zone: UTC+5:00

Baraban (Russian: Барабан) is a rural locality (a village) in Bolshegondryskoye Rural Settlement, Kuyedinsky District, Perm Krai, Russia. The population was 153 as of 2010. There are three streets.

== Geography ==
Baraban is located 24 km southwest of Kuyeda (the district's administrative centre) by road. Rabak is the nearest rural locality.
