= Labytnangi =

Labytnangi Лабытнанги лапыт нангк (Khanty)
- Town

Other transcription(s)
  - Nenets: Лабытнаӈгы
  - Khanty: лапыт нангк
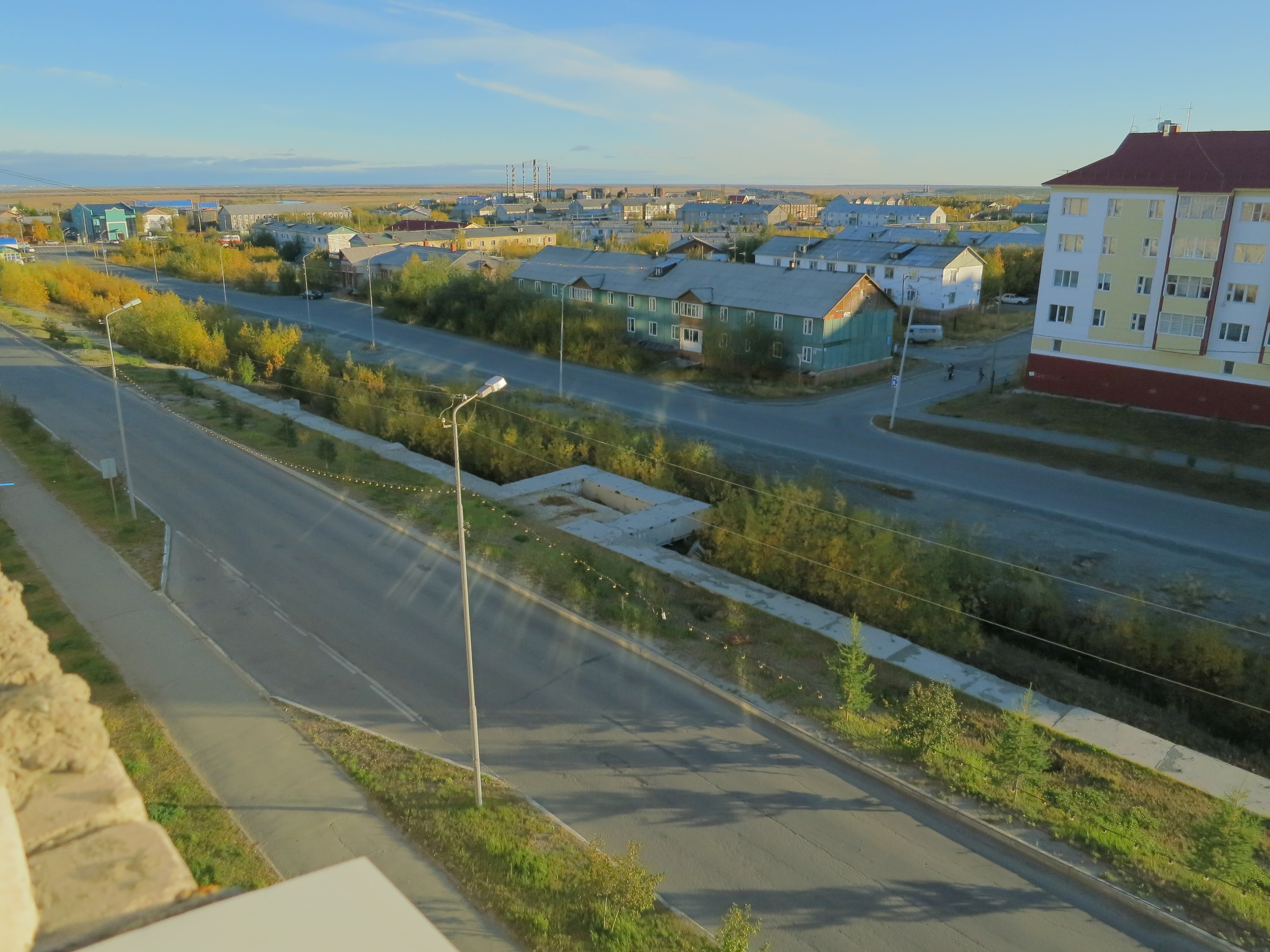

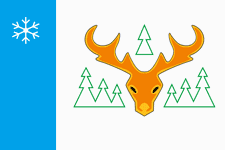
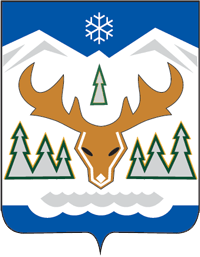
- Flag Coat of arms
- Interactive map of Labytnangi
- Location of Labytnangi Labytnangi (Yamalo-Nenets Autonomous Okrug)
- Coordinates: 66°39′26″N 66°25′06″E
- Country: Russia
- Federal subject: Yamalo-Nenets Autonomous Okrug
- Founded: 1890
- Town status since: 1975

Government
  - Head: Leonid Savchenko
- Elevation: 10 m (33 ft)

Population (2010 Census)
  - Total: 26,936
  - Estimate (2023): 25,969 (−3.6%)

Administrative status
  - Subordinated to: town of okrug significance of Labytnangi
  - Capital of: town of okrug significance of Labytnangi

Municipal status
  - Urban okrug: Labytnangi Urban Okrug
  - Capital of: Labytnangi Urban Okrug
- Time zone: UTC+5 (MSK+2)
- Postal code: 629400
- OKTMO ID: 71953000001
- Website: lbt.yanao.ru

Labytnangi (Russian: Лабытна́нги; from Khanty: лапыт нангк; lit. seven larches; Nenets: Лабытнаӈгы. Labytnaŋgy) is a town in Yamalo-Nenets Autonomous Okrug, Russia, located on the left bank of the Ob River, 20 kilometers (12 mi) northwest of Salekhard. Population: 26,936 (2010 census); 27,304 (2002 census); 31,501 (1989 Soviet census).

== History ==
It was established in 1890. It was granted urban-type settlement status in 1952 and town status in 1975.

Labytnangi is connected to the European Russia by a branch of the Konosha-Vorkuta railway. It is the terminus station on this short stub branch; however, it was built in the early 1950s by Gulag inmates as the first stage of a large project under which the railway would have crossed the north of Tyumen Oblast and reached Igarka on the Yenisei River. The project was abandoned after Joseph Stalin's death.

== Administrative and municipal status ==
Within the framework of administrative divisions, it is incorporated as the town of okrug significance of Labytnangi—an administrative unit with the status equal to that of the districts. As a municipal division, the town of okrug significance of Labytnangi is incorporated as Labytnangi Urban Okrug.
