= Vasily Barabanov =

Soviet OGPU, NKVD and MVD officer

Vasiliy Arsentevich Barabanov

Vasily Arsentevich Barabanov (Russian: Васи́лий Арсе́нтьевич Бараба́нов) (21 April 1900 in village Altufyevo, Moscow Governorate, now part of Moscow – 1964 in Moscow) was a Soviet OGPU, NKVD and MVD officer. He served as a commander of several large prisoner camps set up to build railways and canals in northern parts of Russia. Unlike many of his peers, he avoided harsh treatment of the inmates.

== Life and career ==
Barabanov was born into a family of a wealthy peasant. After the revolution he became Komsomol activist, since June 1919 led the culture and propaganda center in Altufyevo, in August 1920 served in the Red Army. During December 1920 – 1924 he studied at the Military Academy in Petrograd. In 1922 he joined the Communist Party. After a short period of service in the Army, Barabanov was ordered to join OGPU (secret service) and through several positions climbed into a high-level post in the Moscow military district. In 1933 he moved into a senior position in the GULAG (labour camp) administration; in April 1933 he became deputy commander of Dmitlag, a camp set up in the city of Dmitrov in 1932 to dig the Moscow-Volga Canal.

In April 1935 Barabanov was dismissed, expelled from the party ("for drinking and hiding he was son of a kulak") and spent six months in solitary confinement while being investigated. Eventually he was released and exiled to the North with his family. Here he headed labour camps, railway and military projects in Ukhta, Vorkuta, Komsomolsk-on-Amur, Saratov and Pechora. In 1941 he was allowed to join the Party again, in 1944 promoted to lieutenant colonel, in 1946 to colonel. After World War II he was named to several top positions in the labour camps administration. For achievements during construction of the Volga–Don Canal Barabanov was in 1952 awarded title Hero of Socialist Labour, decorated by the Order of Lenin and the "Hammer and Sickle" gold medal and was further promoted. In June 1956 he retired, settled in Moscow and wrote for the Izvestia newspaper.

According to numerous testimonies of former prisoners and employees of MVD alike, Barabanov differed sharply from the majority of the camp commanders. Unlike them, he was trying to improve living conditions of the inmates and motivated them to boost their work performance. A number of former prisoners did attend his funeral.

Barabanov served as a model for the character of Batmanov, a competent organizer and Stalinist hero in the 1948 novel Far from Moscow by Vasily Azhayev.
