= Yevgeny Sidorenko =

Russian serial killer (born 1982)

- Born: Yevgeny Yevgenyevich Sidorenko; 1982 (age 43–44); Sibirtsevo, Primorsky Krai, RSFSR
- Other name: "The Chernigov Butcher"
- Convictions: Manslaughter; N/A
- Penalty: "Several years imprisonment" (1990s); Involuntary commitment (2006)

Details
- Victims: 8
- Span of crimes: 1990s–2005
- Country: Russia
- State: Primorsky
- Date apprehended: 12 December 2005

Yevgeny Yevgenyevich Sidorenko (Russian: Евгений Евгеньевич Сидоренко), known as The Chernigov Butcher (Russian: Черниговский мясник), is a Russian serial killer who committed seven violent murders in his native village of Sibirtsevo, Primorsky Krai, from July to December 2005, shortly after being paroled from a manslaughter conviction.

Ruled unfit to stand trial, Sidorenko was ordered to undergo treatment at a psychiatric facility for an indefinite period.

== Early life ==
Very little is known about the early years of Sidorenko's life. He was born in 1982 in the village of Sibirtsevo, where he grew up in poverty. From an early age, he began to show signs of a mental illness and lost interest in learning, leading to him performing poorly at school.

As a teenager, Sidorenko started acting aggressively towards others and acted impulsively, suffering from outbursts and physically assaulting others. In the mid-1990s, he dropped out of school and started spending time on the streets in the company of criminals.

In the late 1990s, Sidorenko was charged with manslaughter for causing the death of someone, for which he was subsequently convicted. After serving several years in prison, he was granted parole and released in 2004, but by then his mental state had deteriorated dramatically, after which he started committing murders.

== Murders ==
In carrying out his crimes, Sidorenko did not demonstrate any sound reasoning for what he did. Later on, the prosecution would use this to illustrate the fact that he suffered from severe mental issues.

On the night of 12 July 2005, Sidorenko murdered an acquaintance he had a personal dislike for, as well as her male companion, near the railway station in Sibirtsevo. The corpses were found at the intersection of Komsomolskaya Street and the Military Highway near the railroad tracks.

In August, Sidorenko broke into the house of an acquaintance in the early morning hours and set fire to some items in a closet. As a result, all of the occupants – the house's owner, his wife and young child - died in the blaze.

On 23 November, Sidorenko attacked a female acquaintance who lived on Komsomolskaya Street late at night. He managed to stab her, but the victim fiercely resisted and managed to escape, after which Sidorenko began to wander the streets and randomly came across a woman he did not know. He threw her down on the snowy ground and stabbed her death. A few minutes later, in another street, he attacked another woman and stabbed her with a knife, but the victim fought him off and fled.

On the late night of 12 December, Sidorenko showed up at the doorstep of the "Maria" store on Komsomolskaya Street. After standing there for approximately three minutes, he attacked a random woman and inflicted multiple stab wounds on her, killing her in the process.

== Arrest, investigation and internment ==
During the investigation into the murders, investigators at the Primorye Department of Internal Affairs looked into ex-convicts and known mentally-ill persons registered with a psychiatrist, but at the time, Sidorenko was not under suspicion. The survivors of his attacks provided a description of his appearance, allowing for the creation of a facial composite that was distributed on the streets of Sibirtsevo, but this also yielded no results. Rumors began to spread that the murders were either the work of a gang or that the killer was responsible for other murders and disappearances, but this was denied by police.

Sidorenko was arrested on 12 December 2005, shortly after committing the last murder. After his arrest, Sidorenko wrote a confession of guilt and confessed to all the crimes. During interrogations, he was unable to explain the motive for the murders, citing insanity, and subsequently began to show signs of a severe mental disorder. The Chernigov District Court granted the prosecutor's request and detained him, and in early January 2006, he was formally charged with seven murders and two attempted assaults.

At the request of his lawyers, a forensic psychiatric examination was conducted, and Sidorenko was found incapable of standing trial. At the end of 2006, the Chernigov District Court acquitted him by reason of insanity and was transferred to a psychiatric hospital with intensive supervision.

== See also ==
- List of Russian serial killers
