= Vasily Strokov =

Russian murderer (born 1979)

- Born: Vasily Vasilyevich Strokov; 1979 (age 46–47); Omsk, Omsk Oblast, RSFSR
- Conviction: Murder x2
- Penalty: Life imprisonment

Details
- Victims: 2–3
- Span of crimes: 2016 – 2017 (possibly 2000)
- Country: Russia
- State: Omsk
- Date apprehended: 2017

Vasily Vasilyevich Strokov (Russian: Василий Васильевич Строков; born 1979) is a Russian murderer who killed two men in Omsk between 2016 and 2017, dismembering their bodies afterwards and hiding the remains on his property. After he was exposed by his roommate, he was arrested, convicted and sentenced to life imprisonment for the two murders, and remains the sole suspect in the murder of his half-brother in 2000.

== Biography ==
No public information is available on Strokov's upbringing and early life. He first came to police attention in 2000, as a suspect in the murder of his 19-year-old half-brother: the man's body was found at the intersection of Rabochaya and Kharkivska Streets in Omsk by passers-by. According to the investigators, Vasily and his half-brother had been drinking alcohol together, when the latter accidentally put on his elder brother's jacket, got up and tried to leave. Enraged by this, Strokov caught up to him, took out a straight razor and slashed his throat. After making several more cuts on his half-brother's body, Strokov allegedly put on the jacket and walked away. He would be arrested and put on trial for the murder, but ultimately acquitted by the court due to insufficient evidence. Instead, he was sent to a labor colony for another unspecified offence, where he remained until 2015.

After his release from prison, Strokov returned to Omsk and moved in at a small apartment shared with a female acquaintance. On November 16, 2016, Strokov was visited by a 53-year-old neighbor, to whom he offered drinks. The two men drank heavily, and in his intoxicated state, the neighbor asked Strokov whether he had stolen some items belonging to his mother. Angered by the accusation, Strokov began fighting with the man, and in the heat of the moment, he grabbed a nearby knife and stabbed him in the back and chest, killing the victim. Strokov then cut off his head and dragged the body to the abandoned barn near his apartment, where he left the body under a pile of old rags and garbage.

A few months later, on January 19, 2017, Strokov came across a drunken 35-year-old man walking home from work, whom he invited to his home for a drink. The two drank merrily, with the stranger complaining that his girlfriend had moved someplace else and that he had no drinking buddies. At some point, the two began arguing, and in his anger, Strokov grabbed a metal pipe and beat the man to death. He then took a knife and slashed the body in several places, before finally chopping off the man's hands. After this, he dragged the body into the pantry and locked up the door, forbidding his roommate from looking inside.

After avoiding the room for a few days, the woman finally decided to open it, only to find the decomposing remains of a man inside. Horrified, she called the police, who, while searching the rest of the property, also located the other body stored in the barn. Not long after, Strokov was arrested and readily admitted to both murders. He was brought to trial, hastily convicted and sentenced to life imprisonment, as well as ordered to pay 45,000 rubles in damages to the victims' families. A year later, he filed an appeal to the Supreme Court, asking for his sentence to be mitigated on the grounds of insanity, claiming that a voice had ordered him to kill people for the purpose of conducting dark rituals. The request was denied, as investigators had pointed out at trial that the dismemberment of the bodies was done in a methodical and calculated manner to prevent identification, and thusly, providing links to Strokov.

== See also ==
- List of Russian serial killers
