= Roman Kobyzev =

Russian serial killer

- Born: Roman Valeryevich Kobyzev; 16 June 1970 (age 56); Mineralnye Vody, Stavropol Krai, RSFSR
- Convictions: Murder x6 Aggravated assault
- Penalty: Life imprisonment

Details
- Victims: 6
- Span of crimes: 1996–2014
- Country: Russia
- States: Stavropol, Krasnodar
- Date apprehended: 25 May 2014

Roman Valeryevich Kobyzev (Russian: Роман Валерьевич Кобызев; born 16 June 1970) is a Russian serial killer who committed four murders in Stavropol and Krasnodar Krai from 1996 to 1997, and a double murder in 2014. After evading arrest for two decades, he was finally apprehended after his final murder, tried, convicted, and sentenced to life imprisonment.

== Early life ==
Roman Kobyzev was born on 16 June 1970, in Mineralnye Vody, Stavropol Krai. Early on in childhood, he began to exhibit aggressive behaviour towards others, and later earned a reputation as a bully in school. He would frequently get into fights and was constantly at odds with school administration, with educators often having to discipline him for absenteeism and poor academic performance.

After graduating, Kobyzev began to abuse alcohol and started committing crimes. In the late 1980s, he was convicted of assault during a robbery, serving a sentence until the early 1990s. Upon his release, he married a woman named Elvira and had two children with her - despite this, he continued to commit crimes such as stealing and avoided gaining legitimate employment.

=== Murders ===
On the evening of 7 December 1996, Kobyzev and two acquaintances met 38-year-old Valentina Timasheva, who was on her way home from work, near the old railway crossing in Mineralnye Vody. Kobyzev suggested that they drink together, to which Timasheva agreed. After spending some time with them, she tried to leave but was unable to do so because of her drunkenness. At that time, one of Kobyzev's friends beat her up, with Kobyzev himself grabbing a piece of metal pipe and hit her several times on the head, killing Timasheva in the process.

Three days later, Kobyzev was visiting Krasnodar together with a friend named Rasul when they came across 28-year-old Anatoly Sidorenko, a stranger, to whom they offered to drink alcohol. While drinking vodka, Kobyzev and Sidorenko had an argument, during which Kobyzev hit the victim on the head with a stone and killed him. Afterwards, he and Rasul fled the city.

On 26 December Kobyzev decided to rob a house in Mineralnye Vody with the help of Rasul. They chose a shed belonging to 59-year-old Anatoly Zelepukin, who was renting it to a local trader for storage of goods. Kobyzev threatened him to hand over the renter's goods, but when Zelepukin refused, he was stabbed to death with a knife. Kobyzev and Rasul then stole 15 bags of goods which amounted to 3 million non-denominated rubles.

On the afternoon of 11 February 1997, Kobyzev decided to rob the house of an auto parts dealer in Pyatigorsk. After waiting for the man to leave the house to go to work, Kobyzev, together with Rasul, entered the house, where they came across the 63-year-old landlady Polina. After ransacking the house and finding money and a number of other valuables, Polina attempted to escape. She managed to run out of the house and into the street, where she began to cry for help, but Kobyzev caught up with her and stabbed her four times in the abdomen and back.

=== Other crimes and convictions ===
Between late 1997 and 2013, Kobyzev was prosecuted and convicted several times on various charges, including a 5.5 sentence in 2007 for inflicting grievous bodily harm, but was never considered a suspect in the murders. In mid-2013, he was released and returned to Mineralnye Vody. As he had divorced his wife while incarcerated, he began cohabiting with a 49-year-old woman named Marina, an acquaintance he had known for years prior.

=== Double murder ===
In 2014, Kobyzev had difficulties gaining employment and spent a lot of his free time in the company of friends, where they drank alcohol. On 26 February 2014, he got into an argument with Marina and her 70-year-old mother Svetlana, during which he severely beat Marina. In the afternoon of 25 May, Kobyzev had another argument with them over a small disagreement, during which he stabbed Svetlana three times in the chest and neck, killing her on the spot, while Marina was stabbed once in the stomach. After being wounded, the cohabitant managed to leave the apartment and get to a nearby store, whose employees called the police. Marina was then taken to a nearby hospital for treatment, but suffered from complications and soon succumbed to her injuries.

=== Arrest, investigation and trial ===
Kobyzev was arrested on the same day without resistance, and soon willingly confessed to the murders committed in the late 1990s. His testimony was confirmed by his accomplice Rasul, who was found soon after for interrogation. Upon hearing of his arrest, relatives of Kobyzev's victims accused the local police of negligence, which later prompted a press release from the local police department in which investigators partly admitted guilt for not linking the murders at the time. However, it also stated that this was also the result of the unstable economy and societal situation in the country at the time, as well as the lack of modern technology such as DNA.

On 22 October 2015, Kobyzev was convicted on all counts and sentenced to life imprisonment. During the investigation, it was established that his accomplice Rasul was never physically involved in the murders, and since the statute of limitations had passed on all charges that could be pressed against him, he was subsequently released.

== See also ==
- List of Russian serial killers

== In the media and culture ==
- An episode from the documentary series "Conclusions of the Investigations" (Russian: Выводы следствия) titled "Hunting the Beast. Serial Killer Roman Kobyzev" (Russian: Охота на зверя. Серийный убийца Роман Кобызев) was dedicated to the case (Part 1 and Part 2 on YouTube, in Russian)
