= Alexey Kruglov =

Russian serial killer, rapist and pedophile

- Born: Alexey Sergeevich Kruglov; 8 March 1986 (age 40); Moscow, RSFSR
- Other name: The Istra Maniac
- Conviction: Murder
- Penalty: Life imprisonment

Details
- Victims: 4
- Span of crimes: 2005–2009
- Country: Russia
- State: Moscow
- Date apprehended: 2009

Alexey Sergeevich Kruglov (Russian: Алексей Сергеевич Круглов; born 8 March 1986), known as The Istra Maniac (Russian: Истринский маньяк), is a Russian serial killer. He killed 4 children in the Istrinsky District of the Moscow Oblast.

== Biography ==
On 19 July 2005, 12-year-old Mikhail Elshin, along with his 10-year-old brother Alexander and 11-year-old friend Pavel Sokolov left the hostel at a weaving factory in Dedovsk to take a walk but did not return home in the evening. The killer had met the three boys in the area of Christmas Road, when they were returning from the walk. He offered them a ride to the railway station, but eventually turned the car towards a field. On 29 July in the Istrinsky District, not far from the Luzhki village, the mutilated body of Mikhail Elshin was found. On 1 August, one and a half kilometres from the discovery site of Mikhail's body, the bodies of Alexander Elshin and Pavel Sokolov were found. The corpses were covered with foliage and were severely disfigured. The triple murder remained unsolved for about 4 years.

In May 2009, Kruglov decided to strangle his 14-year-old niece. He offered to give her a lift to school. She agreed, but Kruglov instead took her to the Istrinsky District, where he strangled her with a USB cord. After this murder, he was arrested. During the interrogations, he immediately confessed to all four murders. Examinations recognized him as sane, and according to the conclusions of doctors, his actions were "demonstrative".

In 2010, Alexey Kruglov was sentenced to life imprisonment.

== See also ==
- List of Russian serial killers
