= Artur Shayakhmetov =

Russian serial killer and mass murderer (born 1979)

- Born: Artur Rayanovich Shayakhmetov; 1979 (age 46–47); Astrakhan, Astrakhan Oblast, Russian SFSR, Soviet Union
- Other names: "The Astrakhan Killer" "The Astrakhan Chikatilo"
- Conviction: Murder x9
- Penalty: Life imprisonment x2

Details
- Victims: 9 (one as accomplice)
- Span of crimes: 2002; 2009 – 2010
- Country: Russia
- State: Astrakhan
- Date apprehended: 2013

Artur Rayanovich Shayakhmetov (Russian: Артур Раянович Шаяхметов; born 1979), known as the Astrakhan Killer (Russian: Астраханский душегуб, romanized: Astrakhanskiy dushegub), is a Russian serial killer and mass murderer who killed a total of nine people in Astrakhan from 2002 to 2010, aided by two accomplices in some of the murders. He was found guilty у-у-у of the respective crimes in two separate trials, for which he received two life terms.

== Murders ==
Shayakhmetov's first known murders occurred on 20 December 2002. At the time, he was hiding at a friend's house on Pisarev Street as there was a warrant for his arrest for an unrelated assault. On that day, Shayakhmetov and his friend got into an argument, with the former grabbing a knife and repeatedly stabbing his friend and his mother in the chest. Their screams drew the attention of a tenant who was living with them, but upon entering the room to check what was going on, Shayakhmetov stabbed them as well. After killing them, he set the house on fire and disappeared into the night.

In 2009, a friend of Shayakhmetov, Konstantin Bondarenko, told him that he knew an elderly woman who lived alone in the Leninsky City District and had a large amount of valuables and money stashed in her apartment. The pair devised a plan on how to get in, deciding that Shayakhmetov would climb up to her apartment via the second-floor balcony, sneak in, and then open the front door. In November of that year, after successfully completing this task and breaking into the home, Bondarenko proceeded to strangle the woman to death. Afterwards, the two assailants stole valuables worth 115,000 rubles, set the apartment on fire, and fled.

In early June 2010, Shayakhmetov received information that 40-year-old Sergei Agafonov, the owner of a local chain of perfume shops, was planning to travel to Moscow in order to sell some of his goods. Surmizing that he likely had a substantial amount of money at his disposal, he contacted Bondarenko and another accomplice, Yelshad Sariyev, and the trio made plans to rob the family. On the night of 10 to 11 June, the trio broke into the Agafonov family household and held Sergei, his wife and their two children hostage. After threatening to kill them if he did not give them money, Agafonov offered to give up the 500,000 he had in cash, but as he believed there was more around the house, Shayakhmetov and his accomplices instead resorted to beating and torturing their victims for more information. Eventually, Shayakhmetov filled a bathtub with water, grabbed Agafonov's 4-year-old daughter and started dipping her head in and out as an intimidation tactic. In doing so, he unintentionally drowned her. Upon realizing what he had just done, Shayakhmetov ordered Bondarenko and Sariyev to help him kill the others, which they subsequently did so by strangling all three of them to death. They then robbed the house and fled, without setting the apartment on fire this time.

Later that evening, the bodies were discovered by Agafonov's mother, who was supposed to look after the place while they were away. She immediately contacted the police, and not long after, the quadruple murders became a sensation throughout Astrakhan. By that time, Shayakhmetov had grown concerned that Bondarenko might turn them in out of fear that he would be caught, and because of this, he killed him.

== Arrest, trial and imprisonment ==
The Agafonov murders were actively investigated for the following three years, with investigators focusing on every possible clue they could gather. After finding a witness who claimed to have seen an unfamiliar Lada Samara near the apartment, the authorities had him hypnotized in an attempt to extract possible further information. To their surprise, the witness managed to recall all of the numbers on the car's license plate, and after sifting through all similar cars in the area, they eventually identified it as a rental car bought by either Shayakhmetov or one of his cohorts just a day before the murders.

Sometime during 2013, both Shayakhmetov and Sariyev were arrested and charged with the killings. While he initially denied responsibility, Shayakhmetov eventually confessed when presented with the evidence, and even directed police officers to a place in the Kutum River where they had dumped some of their loot. A team of divers was dispatched to investigate and located a bag containing weapons, stolen jewellery from unrelated robberies and several defunct gift cards from Agafonov's perfume shop. In total, the files for the criminal case amounted to 45 volumes, and reportedly had to be delivered in two separate cars.

At the end of the trial, both Shayakhmetov and Sariyev were found guilty of their respective charges, with the former receiving a life term while the latter was given a 7-year sentence. Upon hearing the verdict, Shayakhmetov stood up and loudly professed his innocence and intent to appeal his sentence. At the time, it was reported that was only the second life sentence to be handed down in the Astrakhan Oblast, with the first being given to mob boss and former police officer Rinat Salekhov for orchestrating several contract killings and torturing of hostages.

Shayakhmetov remained unconnected to the previous murders until 2019 when investigators charged him with the 2002 triple murder and the 2009 killing committed with Bondarenko. Due to the overwhelming amount of evidence, he was swiftly found guilty on all charges and given a second life term.

== See also ==
- List of Russian serial killers
