= List of Russian serial killers =

A serial killer is typically a person who murders three or more people, with the murders taking place over more than a month and including a significant period of time between them. The Federal Bureau of Investigation (FBI) defines serial killing as "a series of two or more murders, committed as separate events, usually, but not always, by one offender acting alone".

== Before 1917 ==
Name	Years active	Proven victims	Possible victims	Status	Notes	Ref
Briscorn, Olga	1818–1822	128	128	Died 1836	Known as "The Kursk Saltychikha"; socialite who tortured and killed serfs on her estates	
Radkevich, Nikolay	1909	3	3	Killed by fellow inmates 1916	Known as "Vadim the Bloodsucker"; killed prostitutes in St. Petersburg because he wanted to rid the world of depraved women	
Saltykova, Darya Nikolayevna	1756–1762	38	147	Died 1801	Tortured and killed serfs on her Moscow Oblast estate	

== Soviet era (1917–1991) ==
Name	Years active	Proven victims	Possible victims	Status	Notes	Ref
Biryukov, Anatoly	1977	5	5	Executed 1979	Known as "The Hunter of Babies"; kidnapped and murdered infants in Moscow	
Chernat, Igor	1985–1986	4	13	Executed 1987	Known as "The Evil Spirit of Kaukjarvi"; murdered between four and 13 women in the village of Kamenka, Leningrad Oblast, selling their stolen items afterwards	
Cheryomushkin, Konstantin	1986–1989	4	4	Executed 1993	Known as "The Bataysk Maniac"; brutally raped and killed girls in Bataysk, Rostov Oblast	
Chikatilo, Andrei	1978–1990	52	56+	Executed 1994	Known as "The Rostov Ripper"; killed women and children throughout the Soviet Union	
Evseev, Andrei	1974–1977	9	9	Executed 1979	Known as "The Tagansky Maniac"; killed people in Moscow Oblast, mainly women dressed in red clothing	
Fefilov, Nikolai	1982–1988	7	7	Murdered by his cellmate 1988	Known as "The Urals Strangler"; raped and then strangled young girls in Sverdlovsk abusing the corpses and stealing items afterwards; several innocent men were arrested for his crimes, including one who was executed	
Filippenko, Vasily	1967	5	5	Executed 1968	Known as "The Leningrad Strangler"; raped and strangled women in the area of the Obvodny Canal	
Gridin, Dmitry	1989	3	3	Sentenced to death; commuted to life imprisonment	Known as "The Liftman"; killed young girls in Magnitogorsk, Chelyabinsk Oblast	
Gusakov, Boris	1964–1968	6	6	Executed 1970	Known as "The Student Hunter"; raped 15 girls and young women in Moscow, killing six of them	
Ivanov, Gennady	1973–1980	8	8	Executed 1982	Known as "The Gorky Maniac"; rapist and robber who murdered in Gorky and Vurnary, Chuvashia	
Kashintsev, Sergey	1975–1987	8	59	Executed 1992	Misogynist who murdered a woman in 1975; after release, raped and killed women across the country	
Komaroff, Vasili	1921–1923	33	33	Executed 1923	Known as "The Wolf of Moscow"; horse trader who killed 33 men	
Kozlov, Fyodor	1976–1989	7	7	Committed suicide in prison	Known as "The Iskitim Maniac"; killed his grandmother and underage cousin, later released and continued to kill in sexually motivated attacks	
Kulik, Vasiliy	1984–1986	13	13+	Executed 1989	Raped over 30 young children and elderly women in Irkutsk, killing 13 of them	
Labutkin, Alexander	1933–1935	15	15	Executed 1935	Known as "The One-Armed Bandit"; killed people in the forest of Prigorodny settlement in Leningrad Oblast with a revolver	
Logvinov, Valery	1974–1975	6	6	Executed 1977	Known as "The Hair Hunter"; rapist who sexually assaulted and murdered women with braided hair around Saratov	
Maduev, Sergey	1988–1990	10	10	Died in prison	Prolific brigand who committed numerous robberies around the USSR, some of which resulted in murders; noted for a daring 1991 prison escape, with the aid of a female investigator whom he had seduced	
Maistruk, Anatoly	1981	8	28	Committed suicide before trial	Murdered and beheaded Central Asians in Irkutsk and Voronezh out of apparent hatred	
Makarov, Mikhail	1986	3	3	Executed 1988	Known as "The Executioner"; stabbed and killed two young girls and an older woman in Leningrad, robbing their apartments afterwards	
Markin, Vyacheslav	1991	6	6	Committed suicide before trial	Known as "The Skopinsky Maniac"; habitual criminal who robbed and killed apartment residents in Ryazan Oblast; also killed a former prisoner he quarreled with	
Nagiyev, Anatoly	1979–1980	6	6+	Executed 1981	Killed two women in Pechora, Komi Republic in 1979, then raped and murdered another four in one day aboard a train car in Oryol Oblast; suspected of more murders	
Raevsky, Yuri	1971	6	6	Executed 1973	Known as "The Vnukovo Maniac"; raped, murdered and robbed six women around the Soviet Union, changing location after each murder to avoid arrest	
Sakharov, Nikolay	1977	3	3	Executed 1979	Known as "The Vologda Ripper"; kidnapped, raped and murdered young girls in Vologda	
Serebryakov, Boris	1969–1970	9	9	Executed 1971	Known as "The Kuybyshev Monster"; murdered and mutilated nine people in present-day Samara, including a family of four; also raped the female victims' corpses	
Shcherbakov, Sergey	1985	6	6	Executed 1988	Murdered five women, one of whom was pregnant, and one girl in Leninsk-Kuznetsky, Kemerovo Oblast	
Shestakov, Nikolai	1975	12	12	Executed 1977?	Known as "The Luberetsky Maniac"; truck driver who raped and killed girls and young women in the Lyuberetsky District and the Balashikhinsky District, Moscow Oblast	
Sibiryakov, Andrei	1988	5	5	Executed 1989 or 1990	Known as "The Maniac from Lenenergo"; killed and robbed women in Leningrad while pretending to be an employee of a municipal engineering company	
Slivko, Anatoly	1964–1985	7	7	Executed 1989	Convicted for killing young boys around Nevinnomyssk, Stavropol Krai	
Smirnov, Vasily	1979	5	5	Executed 1980	Known as "The Gatchina Psychopath"; robbed, raped and murdered victims in Gatchina, Leningrad Oblast	
Storozhenko, Vladimir	1978–1981	13	13	Executed 1982	Known as "The Smolensky Strangler"; tortured and murdered women for sexual pleasure in Smolensk Oblast; four other innocent men were arrested before his capture	
Sukletin, Aleksey	1979–1985	7	7	Executed 1987	Known as "The Alligator"; killed and cannibalized young girls and women in Tatarstan with accomplices Madina Shakirova and Anatoly Nikitin	
Sulima, Vladimir	1968	3	3	Executed 1968	Known as "The Bloody Casanova"; raped and murdered three women in Perm Oblast	
Tretyakov, Vladimir	1977–1978	7	7	Executed 1979	Known as "The Arkhangelsk Butcher"; killed and mutilated drunk women in Arkhangelsk	
Tsiuman, Yuri	1986–1991	4	5	Sentenced to death; commuted to life imprisonment	Known as "The Night Guest"; raped and strangled women in his hometown of Taganrog, all of them wearing black pantyhose	
Tyurin, Philipp	1945–1946	14	29	Executed 1947	Known as "The Leningrad Maniac" and "The Hellraiser"; murdered between 14 and 29 people for monetary reasons at his hut in Leningrad	
Usov, Vladimir	1974–1975	5	5	Died in a psychiatric clinic	Known as "The Hunter of Boys"; adolescent paranoid schizophrenic who sodomized and then strangled young boys in Samara Oblast	
Utkin, Anatoly	1968–1973	9	9	Executed 1975	Known as "The Ulyanovsky Maniac"; killed eight girls and one man in Ulyanovsk Oblast	
Vinnichevsky, Vladimir	1938–1939	8	8	Executed 1940	Known as "The Urals Monster"; young rapist who killed children aged between two and four years old	
Zhestkov, Ilya	1968	5	5	Executed in 1971	Known as "The Primorsk Chikatilo"; michman who murdered a male acquaintance in Vladivostok, then raped and killed young girls and women while posing as a movie director	

== After 1991 ==
Name	Years active	Proven victims	Possible victims	Status	Notes	Ref
Ageyev, Nikolai	2006–2024	4	4	Sentenced to life imprisonment	Murdered a cellmate while serving a robbery sentence; paroled and murdered an elderly woman and a young girl during a crime spree; killed another inmate after his second incarceration	
Aituganov, Firuz	2011	4	4	Sentenced to life imprisonment	Illegal Tajikistani immigrant who raped and strangled women in Yekaterinburg	
Andreev, Valeriy	2006–2012	7	7+	Fugitive	Known as "The Orsk Maniac"; truck driver connected to the abductions, rapes and murders of young girls in Orenburg Oblast	
Anoufriev, Artyom	2010–2011	6	6	Sentenced to life imprisonment	Teenager who killed people in his native Irkutsk, together with his partner-in-crime Nikita Lytkin	
Artamonov, Yuri	1995–1997	5	5	Paroled in 2017	Known as "The Izhevsk Raskolnikov"; robber who murdered elderly women during robberies in Izhevsk	
Astashev, Alexander	2003–2005	17	17	Sentenced to involuntary commitment	Known as "The Cheremkhovo Poisoner"; along with his wife and mistress, traveled across Russia and poisoned pensioners in order to steal their property	
Barausov, Andrei	1983–1997	7	7	21 years imprisonment	Known as "The Lensky Maniac"; raped and murdered underage girls around Sakha	
Barkovsky, Roman	2008–2009	3	3	24 years imprisonment	Raped at least four women and girls in Rostov-on-Don and Kazachiy Yerik, killing three of them	
Bayrambekov, Arsen	2003–2014	6	6	13 years and two months imprisonment	Killed two entrepreneurs in contract killings; later murdered homeless people in Pagan rituals	
Beloruscev, Stanislav	2001–2009	12	12+	Sentenced to life imprisonment	Murdered elderly people and acquaintances in Krasnokamsk, sometimes aided by accomplices	
Belov, Vladimir	1991–2002	9	9+	Sentenced to life imprisonment	Known as "The Khovrinsky Maniac"; brigand who robbed and killed eight people in Moscow with his accomplice Sergei Shabanov; suspected of more murders	
Bolgarov, Vasily	2001–2010	4	4	25 years imprisonment	Known as "The Gagarin Killer"; committed a double murder as a minor, and later killed two women in Gagarin, Smolensk Oblast and Smolensk	
Bolkhovsky, Viktor	1980–1999	4	4	Sentenced to life imprisonment	Known as "The Necromancer Maniac"; killed his wife in 1980; paroled and murdered three women he met through lonely hearts ads in Kemerovo and Chita	
Bratilov, Vladimir	1997–1998	8	8	Sentenced to life imprisonment	Robber and rapist who murdered girls and women in Lysva	
Burtsev, Roman	1993–1996	6	6	Died in prison	Known as "The Kamensky Chikatilo"; raped and strangled six young children in his hometown of Kamensk-Shakhtinsky, Rostov Oblast, hiding their bodies afterwards	
Bushuyev, Alexander	1997–2002	7	7	44 years imprisonment	Known as "The Gardener Maniac"; horticulturalist who tortured and murdered young boys and teenagers in Arkhangelsk	
Bychkov, Alexander	2009–2012	9	11	Sentenced to life imprisonment	Known as "The Belinsky Cannibal"; suspected cannibal who killed nine people in Belinsky, Penza Oblast; suspected of 11 people based on evidence discovered in his home	
Chyorny, Sergey	1999	10	11	Died in prison	Known as "The Beast"; strangled 10 women in Smolensk, and is suspected of drowning another woman	
Chigirinsky, Nikolai	2005–2009	3	3	Sentenced to life imprisonment	Known as "The Pervouralsk Ripper"; mechanic who killed, raped and then mutilated young girls in Pervouralsk, Sverdlovsk Oblast; also burned the victims' clothes	
Chizhov, Oleg	2006–2007	4	4	22.5 years of imprisonment	Known as "The Birsky Maniac"; raped and brutally killed four girls in Birsk, Bashkortostan; assisted by two accomplices in his first rape	
Christan, German	2003–2017	5	5	Sentenced to life imprisonment	Killed acquaintances and neighbors during quarrels, setting them on fire while they were still alive	
Chuplinsky, Yevgeny	1998–2006	19	19+	Sentenced to life imprisonment	Known as "The Novosibirsk Maniac"; killed prostitutes around Novosibirsk	
Churasov, Igor	1997–2000	7	7	Sentenced to involuntary commitment	Known as "The Scavenger of Humanity"; together with accomplice Gennady Shurmanov, killed and dismembered several people in Ryazan, then ate some of their remains	
Dilschneider, Dmitry	2007	5	5	Sentenced to life imprisonment	Known as "The Novosibirsk Raskolnikov"; murdered five people during robberies in Novosibirsk	
Draganer, Vladimir	1999	5	5	Sentenced to life imprisonment	Known as "The Kamyshin Maniac"; killed four girls and two young teenagers with accomplices in the vicinity of Kamyshin, Volgograd Oblast	
Dolin, Vladimir	1999–2008	3	3	Committed suicide in prison	Known as "The Kopeysk Maniac"; killed a teenager, and after his release, raped and killed two underage girls in Kopeysk, Chelyabinsk Oblast	
Dudin, Nikolai	1987–2002	13	13	Sentenced to life imprisonment	Known as "The Grim Maniac"; killed his father in 1987, and after his release, killed 12 more people while in an intoxicated state in Furmanov, Ivanovo Oblast	
Elistratov, Alexander	2005–2007	6	6	Sentenced to life imprisonment	Known as "The Bloody Taxi Driver"; unlicensed taxi driver who murdered and robbed his passengers in Moscow	
Ershov, Vadim	1992–1995	19	19	Sentenced to death; commuted to life imprisonment	Known as "The Krasnoyarsk Beast"; committed 70 total crimes around Krasnoyarsk, including killing 19 people and attempting to kill eight others	
Falkin, Alexey	2004–2017	4	4	Sentenced to life imprisonment	Known as "The EMERCOM Maniac"; former firefighter who raped and murdered women in Yekaterinburg and Verkhnyaya Pyshma, Sverdlovsk Oblast	
Fokin, Viktor	1996–2000	9	10+	Died in prison	Known as "The Pensioner Maniac" and "The Grandfather Ripper"; lured, killed and dismembered prostitutes and alcohol abusers into his home, then disposed of their remains in garbage containers	
Gabidullin, Farit	1989–2000	14	14+	Sentenced to life imprisonment	Together with his brother, Timur, sexually assaulted and murdered children and vagrants around Chelyabinsk	
Gaichayev, Ramses	1997–1999	10	10+	Sentenced to death; commuted to life imprisonment	Robbed, raped, tortured and murdered ethnic Russians with four accomplices in Chervlennaya and Pyatigorsk	
Gaidamachuk, Irina	2002–2010	17	17	20 years imprisonment	Known as "Satan in a Skirt"; killed elderly women in Sverdlovsk Oblast in order to pay for vodka to feed her alcohol addiction	
Galstyan, Aharon	2005–2008	7	7	Sentenced to life imprisonment	Known as "The Taxi Driver Poisoner"; Armenian-born serial killer and thief, he drugged and robbed his passengers in Saint Petersburg, resulting in seven fatalities	
Gerankov, Pyotr	1981–1995	10	10	Sentenced to death; commuted to life imprisonment	Burglar who committed a murder at age 17 in 1981 and later nine additional murders in 1995, some of which were committed with his wife	
Gerashchenko, Alexander	1998–2005	7	7	Sentenced to life imprisonment	Known as "The Solikamsk Shooter"; shot and killed security guards in Solikamsk, Perm Oblast, in order to steal their weapons	
Golovachyov, Andrei	1996–2000	14	14+	Sentenced to life imprisonment	Known as "The Apartment Maniac"; fugitive who killed various people, mostly lodgers and landlords, across six regions	
Golovkin, Sergey	1986–1992	11	13+	Executed 1996	Known as "The Fisher"; tortured, raped and killed young boys in his garage basement or forests around Moscow	
Golubev, Dmitry	1991–2008	4	4	Sentenced to life imprisonment	Stateless man who was convicted of a 1991 robbery-murder in Tashkent; after release, murdered three fishermen during an argument in Penza Oblast in 2008	
Gorbunov, Denis	2004–2005	5	5	Committed suicide in prison	Known as "The Ad Killer"; drug addict who killed five women in Chelyabinsk he contacted through newspaper ads	
Gorin, Denis	2002–2012	4	4+	Died in 2024	Murdered acquaintances in his hometown of Aniva with the help of his brother Evgeniy, cannibalizing their remains afterwards	
Grabovoi, Artyom	2014	3	3	Committed suicide to avoid apprehension	Known as "The Knyaze–Volkonskoye Maniac"; garrison officer who raped and murdered women in the village of Knyaze–Volkonskoye, Khabarovsk Krai, where he stationed at the time	
Greba, Alexander	1996–2004	5	5	Sentenced to life imprisonment	Known as "The Goblin"; killed five people in Belgorod Oblast, including four women who resembled his mother	
Gritsenko, Yuri	1993–2001	5	5	Killed in action	Known as "The Zelenograd Chikatilo"; murdered four women in his native Zelenograd, Moscow, shortly after being released from prison for a previous murder	
Gromov, Alexey	1996–2011	5	5	Sentenced to life imprisonment	Known as "The Bluebeard"; murdered four wives and one of their mothers in Yaroslavl and Oryol	
Guryanov, Vladimir	2007–2008	13	13+	Sentenced to life imprisonment	Together with accomplice Elvira Egorycheva, known as "The Bloody Sectarians"; killed fortune tellers and strangers in religiously motivated attacks in Nizhny Novgorod	
Haroyan, Levan	2000–2002	6	20+	Sentenced to compulsory treatment	Known as "The Krasnodar Chikatilo"; schizophrenic man who raped, robbed, and murdered female hitchhikers	
Ivanov, Alexei	2015	4	4	Sentenced to life imprisonment	Known as the "Taxi Driver Maniac"; raped and beat to death prostitutes in Novosibirsk, dismembering their bodies post-mortem and dumping them in the nearby woods	
Kalinin, Denis	2005	14	14	19 years imprisonment	Known as "The Salesman Maniac"; robbed and killed pensioners around Pskov, Chuvashia and Rostov Oblast	
Kalinin, Roman	2003–2009	4	4	Sentenced to life imprisonment	Rapist who lured, raped and subsequently killed schoolgirls in Chita; would steal some of the victim's belongings after the murder to simulate a robbery	
Karimov, Dmitry	2005–2006	7	7	Sentenced to life imprisonment	Known as "The Concrete Products Maniac"; raped and killed women near concrete products factories in Yekaterinburg	
Karnov, Leonid	2005–2008	5	5	Sentenced to life imprisonment	Known as "The Petersburg Othello"; killed and robbed acquaintances in Saint Petersburg after drunken quarrels	
Kazakov, Dmitry	2009–2021	6	6	Committed suicide before trial	Murdered security guards and one woman during robberies in Novosibirsk and Tomsk	
Khalmetov, Sergey	2002–2007	4	4+	Sentenced to life imprisonment	Raped and murdered young girls and women in Perm and Udmurtia	
Khiletsky, Vasily	2006–2009	3	5	Sentenced to life imprisonment	Ukrainian immigrant who raped and murdered a woman, then blamed two innocent men for the crime; later killed two women during a burglary	
Khrenov, Maxim	2010–2011	4	4+	Sentenced to life imprisonment	Known as "The Ivanovo Maniac"; robbed, raped and murdered women in Ivanovo Oblast	
Kiselev, Alexander	2003–2022	3	3	Sentenced to 13.5 years imprisonment	Known as "The Tie Maniac"; strangled three female acquaintances with ties that matched the color of their socks	
Kitaev, Artur	1990–1992	6	6	Killed by his cellmate	Beat, raped and strangled female hitchhikers in Smolensk; considered the last sexual serial killer of the USSR	
Kiyko, Andrei	2004–2007	3	3+	47 years imprisonment	Known as "The Sosnovsky Maniac"; assaulted and raped young girls and women in Saint Petersburg's Sosnovsky Park, sometimes killing them	
Kobyzev, Roman	1996–2014	6	6	Sentenced to life imprisonment	Murdered people during robberies and quarrels in Stavropol and Krasnodar Krai	
Kolebin, Vladimir	1999–2014	6	6	19 years imprisonment	Known as "The Rybinsky Maniac"; murdered various people in personal disputes in Rybnoye, Krasnoyarsk Krai	
Kolpakov, Vladimir	1987–1994	3	5	Committed suicide to avoid apprehension	Convicted of murdering two male acquaintances in 1994; linked via DNA to the 1987 rape, murder and dismemberment of an underage girl in Ulyanovsk	
Kolesnikov, Yevgeny	2006–2007	6	6	Committed suicide in prison	Known as "The Orphan of Solikamsk"; robbed and killed elderly people in Solikamsk with the aid of his girlfriend	
Komin, Aleksandr	1995–1997	4	4	Committed suicide in prison	Known as "The Slaveholder"; along with his accomplice Alexander Mikheev, lured and then forced people to work in his underground bunker, killing those he no longer needed or feared would expose him	
Kopylov, Dmitry	2004–2005	5	5	10 years imprisonment	Known as "The Youth Maniac"; teenager who attacked, raped and killed women and one man around Chelyabinsk Oblast	
Kopytov, Valery	2000–2004	19	19	25 years imprisonment	Known as "The Barnaul Chikatilo"; homeless man who killed other homeless people in Altai Krai	
Kozlenya, Nikolai	1998–2001	7	7	Sentenced to life imprisonment	Killed drivers in order to steal their cars and later sell the disassembled parts	
Krasnoyarov, Yevgeny	2013–2016	6	6	Sentenced to life imprisonment	Known as "The Ripper of Tajiks"; neo-Nazi who murdered foreign migrants in Chita and the surrounding area	
Krotov, Vadim	1997–1999	4	4	Sentenced to life imprisonment	Known as "The Primorsky Chikatilo"; child molester who lured young girls into his apartment in Nakhodka, Primorsky Krai, to produce child pornography, killing the girls when they tried to escape	
Kruglov, Alexey	2005–2009	4	4	Sentenced to life imprisonment	Known as "The Istra Maniac"; kidnapped and then brutally killed a trio of boys in the Istrinsky District, Moscow Oblast, strangling his niece a few years later	
Kuleshov, Dmitry	1994–2006	3	3	25 years imprisonment	Known as "The Spruce Robber"; pedophile who murdered three children in Rostov-on-Don on two separate occasions	
Kuzikov, Ilshat	1994–1995	3	3+	Sentenced to compulsory treatment	Murdered and cannibalized at least three men in his apartment in Saint Petersburg	
Kuzmin, Vladimir	1997	7	11	Sentenced to life imprisonment	Raped and robbed between seven and 11 people, mostly young boys and men, in Moscow; assisted in first two murders by Denis Kalistratov	
Kuznetsov, Sergey	2007–2008	6	8	Sentenced to involuntary commitment	Known as "The Kryazh Maniac"; mentally-ill hoarder who poisoned and strangled drunk men in Samara, stealing their clothes and belongings afterwards	
Laletin, Gennady	2004–2010	5	5	Sentenced to life imprisonment	Known as "Gena the Worm"; vagrant who stabbed and bludgeoned acquaintances to death across Buryatia	
Lebed, Dmitry	2012–2017	5	5+	Sentenced to life imprisonment	Known as "The Abakan Strangler"; taxi driver who raped and strangled at least five women in Abakan, Khakassia	
Litvin, Nikolai	1999	10	10+	Sentenced to involuntary commitment	Known as "The Prokopyevsk Strangler"; raped and murdered young girls and women around Prokopyevsk, Kemerovo Oblast, including a pregnant woman	
Lobacheva, Elena	2014–2015	15	15+	13 years imprisonment	Main member of a Neo-Nazi gang that killed alcoholic tramps and beggars around Moscow Oblast and Yaroslavl Oblast	
Lobanov, Alexander	1999–2001	5	5	Committed suicide in prison	Known as "The Motovilikha Maniac"; sadist who raped and murdered women who rejected his advances in his hometown of Perm, mutilating their bodies and disemboweling them post-mortem	
Lokhtachyov, Alexander	2003–2004	10	10	Sentenced to life imprisonment	Raped, killed and burned women around Magnitogorsk with accomplice Pavel Safonov; killed two male witnesses by himself	
Lozovoi, Sergey	2002	6	6+	Sentenced to life imprisonment	Known as "The Giant"; robber who brutally murdered people around Rostov-on-Don and Sochi; suspected of more murders	
Lytkin, Nikita	2010–2011	6	6	Committed suicide in prison	Teenager who killed people in his native Irkutsk, together with his partner-in-crime Artyom Anoufriev	
Malyuk, Viktor	2000–2001	4	4	Committed suicide in prison	Known as "The Ad Killer"; lured, killed and then robbed victims he found through newspaper advertisements	
Manishin, Vitaly	1989–2000	11	15	Sentenced to 25 years imprisonment	Known as "The Barnaul Maniac"; raped and murdered young girls women in Barnaul and Buranovo	
Marchev, Vladimir	2010–2011	3	3	Sentenced to life imprisonment	Known as "The Degtyarsk Maniac"; murdered three women around the Sverdlovsk Oblast for robbery, then decapitated and dismembered the bodies post-mortem	
Markov, Anatoly	2001–2002	12	12	19 years imprisonment	Known as "The Psotino Butcher"; murdered acquaintances during drunken quarrels, most of them with the help of his Ukrainian accomplice Alexander Lesnoy	
Martirosyan, Georgy	2011–2012	3	4	23 years imprisonment	Known as "Gosha the Magician"; Georgian-born Russian serial killer fraudulent spiritual healer who poisoned three women in Korolyov, Moscow Oblast	
Martynov, Sergei	1992–2010	9	9+	Sentenced to life imprisonment	Known as "The Torso Killer"; killed women across western and central Russia	
Maslich, Alexander	1989–1996	5	5	Sentenced to death; commuted to life imprisonment	Murdered a man during a robbery in the late 1980s and killed another four while incarcerated	
Matyakubov, Bakhtiyor	2015	10	10+	Sentenced to life imprisonment	Known as "The Uzbek Chikatilo"; Uzbekistani migrant who stabbed women to death across Russia, Uzbekistan and Ukraine	
Melyukh, Andrei	2000–2002	10	10	Sentenced to life imprisonment	Known as "The Brick Maniac"; robbed and murdered elderly women in Chelyabinsk by hitting them on the head with a brick	
Meshcheryakov, Andrei	2002	5	5	25 years imprisonment	Known as "The Balashikhinsky Maniac"; strangled women in the span of two months for the purpose of robbery in Moscow	
Mirgorod, Vladimir	2002–2004	18	18	Sentenced to life imprisonment	Also known as "The Strangler"; raped and strangled 17 women in Moscow, also killing a woman's son	
Mukhankin, Vladimir	1995	9	9	Sentenced to death; commuted to life imprisonment	Known as "The Pupil of Chikatilo"; killed women in Rostov Oblast	
Mursalimov, Yakhiya	1998–1999	13	13	Sentenced to life imprisonment	Murdered thirteen people during robberies in Orenburg Oblast	
Murylev, Alexander	1993–1994	8	8	Sentenced to death; commuted to life imprisonment	Known as "Yeltsin's Sanitary"; stock broker who killed alcoholics around Moscow in order to appropriate and then sell their apartments	
Nagorny, Yevgeny	1998	10	10	Sentenced to life imprisonment	Automechanic who, together with accomplice Sergei Stavitsky, killed clients with expensive cars in order to sell them later on	
Nazarenko, Maxim	2010–2014	11	11+	Killed by police	Murdered pensioners during home invasions in Taganrog	
Nedorezkov, Alexander	2005	5	7	Committed suicide before trial	Known as "The Rampant Maniac"; killed a stranger and an acquaintance's family in Zakamsk for unknown reasons after being paroled from a prison sentencen	
Neznamov, Mikhail	2000–2005	6	6	17 years imprisonment	Known as "The Kamensk Strangler"; raped and murdered teenage girls and women in his hometown of Kamensk-Uralsky	
Novosyolov, Mikhail	1977–1995	22	22	Sentenced to civil commitment	Known as "The Necrophile Rebel"; Tajik necrophile who killed people in Russia and his native country	
Nurmagomedov, Murad	2013–2016	4	5	18 years imprisonment	Killed four acquaintances in Moscow and Dagestan over arguments; suspected in a 2004 murder	
Orunbayev, Kegashbek	1991–2012	6	6	Sentenced to life imprisonment	Known as "The Ivolginsky Ripper"; Kyrgyzstani laborer who killed, raped, dismembered and cannibalized his victims' corpses in Altai Krai and Buryatia	
Osipenko, Sergey	2005–2006	4	4	Sentenced to life imprisonment	Known as "The Rossoshansky Maniac"; Kazakhstani man who raped, murdered and robbed four women in Voronezh Oblast	
Panchenko, Ivan	1998–2008	5	5	Sentenced to life imprisonment	Known as "The Svetlograd Maniac"; kidnapped and killed young girls in Svetlograd, Stavropol Krai, and also killed a colleague he deserted with	
Petrosyan, Oleg	1992–2008	6	7	Sentenced to compulsory treatment	Known as "The Karate Maniac"; schizophrenic sadist who confessed to murdering a homeless man in his youth, and later killed six more between 2005 and 2008 in Moscow	
Petrov, Maxim	1999–2000	12	19	Sentenced to life imprisonment	Known as "Doctor Death"; practicing doctor who killed his patients for the purpose of robbery	
Petrov, Yevgeny	1998–2003	11	11	Sentenced to life imprisonment	Known as "The Novouralsk Ripper"; pedophile who kidnapped, raped and killed young girls around Novouralsk, Sverdlovsk Oblast, mutilating and burning their corpses afterwards	
Pichushkin, Alexander	1992–2006	49	60	Sentenced to life imprisonment	Known as "The Chessboard Killer"; killed at least 49 people in Moscow's Bitsa Park	
Pirovskih, Alexander	1997–1999	5	5	Sentenced to life imprisonment	Fraudster who murdered people for monetary purposes, including his wife and her children from the first marriage	
Pischikov, Denis	2002–2003	14	17	Sentenced to life imprisonment	Known as "The Shivering Creature"; robbed and killed elderly people in Moscow and Vladimir Oblast	
Podkopaev, Roman	2007–2013	30	30	Unknown	Family of robbers, led by Roman and his wife Inessa Tarverdiyeva, who robbed and killed people around the North Caucasian Federal District	
Podshivalov, Timofey	2011	4	4	Sentenced to life imprisonment	Known as "The Zakamsky Maniac"; considered one of the worst criminals in Perm's history	
Popkov, Mikhail	1992–2010	87	87+	Sentenced to life imprisonment	Known as "The Werewolf"; assaulted and murdered 85 women and one of his colleagues in Angarsk, Irkutsk, and Vladivostok	
Prodan, Fyodor	1997–2017	4	4	Sentenced to life imprisonment	Murdered his cohabitants during quarrels	
Prodan, Ion	1998–1999	5	5+	Released in 2014	Known as "The Domodedovo Ghoul"; Moldovan guest worker who killed people near railways	
Ptitsyn, Igor	2009–2011	3	3+	Sentenced to life imprisonment	Known as "The Kazan Maniac"; serial rapist who killed three women between 2009 and 2011, primarily around Lake Glubokoe	
Rakhmanov, Anushervon	2014–2015	7	7	Committed suicide before trial	Known as "Mosgaz-2"; copycat of Vladimir Ionesyan who murdered and robbed his victims to support his drug and alcohol addictions	
Razzakov, Hafiz	2004	9	9	Sentenced to life imprisonment	Known as "The Borovets Maniac"; Uzbekistani-born Islamist who murdered couples near Naberezhnye Chelny because he considered them infidels	
Retunsky, Vladimir	1990–1996	8	12	Released 2015	Known as "The Povorinsky Maniac"; kidnapped, raped and killed hitchhikers in his hometown of Povorino, Voronezh Oblast; also suspected of abusing the corpses; initially sentenced to death, but commuted to 15 years imprisonment and subsequently released in 2015	
Roldugin, Andrei	2002	3	3	Sentenced to life imprisonment	Known as "The Voronezh Maniac"; serial rapist who raped and killed teenagers in Voronezh, sexually abusing them post-mortem	
Romanov, Vladimir	1991–2005	12	20	Committed suicide in prison	Known as "The Kaliningrad Maniac"; pedophile who raped and murdered 12 girls and young women in Kaliningrad Oblast; suspected of more murders	
Ryakhovsky, Sergei	1988–1993	19	19+	Sentenced to death; commuted to life imprisonment	Known as "The Hippopotamus"; killed prostitutes and homosexuals in order to "cleanse" society	
Rylkov, Oleg	1994–1997	6	9	Sentenced to death; commuted to life imprisonment	Known as "The Tolyatti Ripper"; rapist and pedophile who raped between 37 and 39 underage girls, and killed six people in Tolyatti, Samara Oblast; suspect in three other murders	
Ryno, Artur	2006–2007	37	37	10 years of penal labour	Leader of racist skinhead gang, along with Pavel Skachevsky, who killed immigrants	
Ryzhkov, Alexey	2000–2001	5	5	Sentenced to life imprisonment	Known as "The Rubtsovsk Ripper"; raped and murdered five females in Rubtsovsk, Altai Krai between November 2000 and January 2001	
Safonov, Pavel	2003–2004	8	8	Sentenced to life imprisonment	Raped, killed and burned women around Magnitogorsk with accomplice Alexander Lokhtachyov	
Samsonova, Tamara	1995–2015	13	13+	Sentenced to compulsory treatment	Known as "The Granny Ripper"; St. Petersburg woman who killed and allegedly cannibalized 13 people	
Sarabashyan, David	2000–2018	5	5	Sentenced to life imprisonment	Known as "The Suvorov Maniac"; soldier who raped and strangled women around Rostov Oblast, most of them while AWOL	
Sedov, Sergey	1998–1999	6	6	Sentenced to compulsory treatment	Known as "The Sokolniki Maniac"; mentally-ill man who killed people in Moscow's Sokolniki Park, sexually abusing the corpses afterwards	
Sedykh, Anatoly	1998–2003	12	12	Sentenced to life imprisonment	Known as "The Lipetsk Chikatilo"; raped and murdered 12 women in Lipetsk, robbing the corpses afterwards	
Seleznev, Eduard	2002–2018	5	5	Sentenced to life imprisonment	Known as "The Arkhangelsk Cannibal"; stabbed, dismembered and cannibalized the remains of drinking companions in Arkhangelsk	
Serebrennikov, Gennady	2002–2003	5	5	Sentenced to life imprisonment	Former police major who murdered witnesses to prevent his son from going to trial	
Shayakhmedov, Shavkat	1994–2021	5	6+	Died in prison	Known as "The Zalegoshchensky Maniac"; Uzbekistani-born rapist who raped and murdered children and one young woman in Tajikistan and Russia	
Shayakhmetov, Artur	2002–2010	9	9	Sentenced to life imprisonment	Known as "The Astrakhan Killer"; murdered people during arguments and robberies, sometimes with two accomplices	
Shemyakov, Eduard	1996–1998	10	10	Sentenced to compulsory treatment	Known as "The Resort Maniac"; raped, killed and dismembered 10 women in St. Petersburg, supposedly cannibalizing one of the victims	
Shipilov, Sergey	1995–1999	14	14	Sentenced to life imprisonment	Known as "The Velsk Chikatilo"; killed 14 female hitchhikers in Velsk, Arkhangelsk Oblast, most of them while out on prison leave	
Shishikhin, Ruslan	2006–2007	3	3	Sentenced to involuntary commitment	Known as "The Yudino Maniac"; mentally-ill schizophrenic who sexually assaulted and killed two women and a young girl in Kazan	
Shubin, Nikolay	2004–2006	13	13	Sentenced to compulsory treatment	Known as "The Cemetery Director"; Georgian-born Russian serial killer, paranoid schizophrenic who killed 13 people in Lipetsk after losing in chess games to them	
Shumkov, Konstantin	2008	5	5	25 years imprisonment	Leader of "The Blood Magic Gang"; along with four teenage accomplices, murdered five homeless people in Irkutsk from January to June 2008 and wounded three others	
Shuvalov, Pavel	1991–1995	5	5	Died in prison	Known as "The Nevsky Forest Park Maniac"; policeman who lured, raped and then killed young girls who wore pantyhoses in St. Petersburg	
Sidorenko, Yevgeny	1990s–2005	8	8	Sentenced to involuntary commitment	Known as "The Chernigov Butcher"; mentally-ill man who murdered people at random in Sibirtsevo, Primorsky Krai	
Skachevsky, Pavel	2006–2007	37	37	10 years of penal labour	Leader of a racist skinhead gang, together with Artur Ryno, who killed immigrants	
Skoptsov, Valery	1995–1996	9	9	Died in prison	Known as "The Villain of all Trades"; prolific career criminal noted for his wide variety of crimes, including murders in Oryol and Bryansk Oblasts	
Solovyov, Vyacheslav	2003–2007	6	6	Died from phlegmon while incarcerated	Known as "The Yaroslavl Poisoner"; poisoned six people in his hometown of Yaroslavl, including his wife, daughter and an investigator	
Sotnikov, Viktor	2000–2011	8	8	Sentenced to life imprisonment	Killed eight people in Lipetsk and Tambov Oblasts	
Sparikhin, Yuri	1980–2020	4	4	Sentenced to life imprisonment	Murdered four people over the span of 40 years in Krasnodar Krai, including two children	
Spesivtsev, Alexander	1991–1996	20	80+	Sentenced to compulsory treatment	Known as "The Siberian Ripper"; tortured and killed street children and young women with the help of his mother Lyudmila, allegedly cannibalizing some of them	
Steblyakov, Serhiy	2010	5	5	Sentenced to life imprisonment	Known as "The Old Lady Strangler"; Ukrainian guest worker who, together with two accomplices, strangled then robbed elderly female veterans and gay men around Moscow	
Stepanov, Yuri	2003–2008	7	7	Sentenced to life imprisonment	Murdered homeless people in Tyumen, including his accomplice	
Strack, Ivan	2004–2017	4	4	22 years imprisonment	Known as "The Leningrad Maniac"; killed his grandfather and two schoolgirls as a minor; killed another woman 12 years later after release from a psychiatric hospital	
Surikov, Andrei	2008	3	3	Sentenced to involuntary commitment	Known as "The Naro-Fominsk Maniac"; former traffic policeman who murdered women in Naro-Fominsk, Moscow Oblast in the name of Lucifer	
Sushko, Yuriy	2013–2015	5	5	Sentenced to life imprisonment	Known as "The Homeless Killer"; homeless Ukrainian man who beat to death four drinking companions and his girlfriend to death in Uzlovaya, Tula Oblast; also burned their bodies	
Tagirov, Radik	2011–2012	31	31	Sentenced to life imprisonment	Known as "The Volga Maniac"; from March 2011 to September 2012, in the Volga and Ural Federal Districts, Tagirov murdered 31 people in khrushchevkas, all of whom were single women aged 75 to 90 years old	
Tambasov, Dmitry	2001–2002	3	11	Sentenced to life imprisonment; commuted to 25 years imprisonment	Known as "The Perm Chikatilo"; mentally-ill sexual deviant who raped and murdered young women in Perm	
Taran, Alexander	2003–2004	3	3	23 years imprisonment	Known as "The Voroshilov Sharpshooter"; beekeeper who murdered police officials in order to avenge his children; guilt has been questioned	
Tarverdiyeva, Inessa	2007–2013	30	30	Unknown	Family of robbers, led by Inessa and her husband Roman Podkopaev, who robbed and killed people in the North Caucasian Federal District	
Ten, Oleg	2004–2005	3	3+	Sentenced to life imprisonment	Known as "The Maniac Policeman"; Uzbekistani-born policeman who stabbed and mutilated women during robberies in Saint Petersburg	
Tigoyev, Alexey	1990–2003	7	9	Sentenced to involuntary commitment	Known as "The Medvezhyegorsk Maniac"; killed his father's friend in 1990; after release, hacked to death several acquaintances and strangers in Karelia and Pskov	
Tsukanov, Sergey	1989–1999	8	8	Sentenced to involuntary commitment	Known as "The Cemetery Maniac"; raped and killed elderly women around Tula, beginning when he was a teenager	
Tushinsky, Vladimir	2010–2014	5	5	Died from a cardiac arrest while incarcerated	Known as "The Kamchatka Chikatilo"; killed five girls in Petropavlovsk-Kamchatsky to satisfy his sexual urges; also raped his underage stepdaughter	
Ushkalo, Alexander	1998–1999	6	6	Sentenced to involuntary commitment	Kyrgyzstani-born schizophrenic thief who killed and robbed various victims in Kemerovo and Novosibirsk	
Ustinovich, Mikhail	1992–1993	4	4	Sentenced to death; commuted to life imprisonment	Prolific career criminal who murdered some of his robbery victims in Moscow	
Varakin, Alexei	2010–2023	4	4	Sentenced to involuntary commitment	Known as "The Prostitute Killer"; mentally-ill Uzbek man who stabbed prostitutes in Saint Petersburg and Moscow	
Vasilyev, Alexander	1997–2001	17	17	Died in 2020	Known as "The Black Angel"; tortured, killed and robbed pensioners and cab drivers around Krasnoyarsk out of a homicidal mania	
Voitov, Pavel	2014–2015	15	15+	Sentenced to life imprisonment	Leader of a Neo-Nazi gang that killed alcoholic tramps and beggars around Moscow and Yaroslavl Oblasts	
Voronenko, Dmitry	2006–2007	4	4	Sentenced to life imprisonment	Known as "The Petersburg Maniac"; Kyrgyzstani-Ukrainian rapist who raped and killed girls and young women in St. Petersburg	
Voronov, Valery	2005–2007	3	3+	Sentenced to compulsory treatment	Known as "The Lyuban Maniac"; attacked women and girls near toilet stalls in Lyuban, Leningrad Oblast, killing some of them	
Vygovsky, Alexey	2006–2009	17	17	22 years imprisonment	Known as "The Station Poisoner"; together with two accomplices, drugged and robbed commuters on trains along Moscow railway stations, some of whom died from the attacks	
Wirth, Oleg	2011–2012	5	5	Sentenced to life imprisonment	Murdered five acquaintances in drunken quarrels in Urusha, Amur Oblast; aided by his girlfriend in two of them	
Yaikov, Vyacheslav	2002–2003	6	6	Sentenced to compulsory treatment	Known as "The Kopeysk Strangler"; mentally-ill rapist who killed six women in Kopeysk, Chelyabinsk Oblast	
Yezhov, Andrey	2010–2020	7	7+	Committed suicide before trial	Known as "The Kashirsky Maniac"; voyeur who broke into homes of elderly women around Moscow, whom he strangled and raped	
Yudin, Mikhail	1999–2002	5	5	Sentenced to life imprisonment	Known as "The Berdsk Maniac"; raped and killed five women in Berdsk, Novosibirsk Oblast, stealing their valuables and then giving them to his wife or mother	
Yurkin, Andrei	1994–1995	5	5	Sentenced to death; commuted to 15 years	Known as "The Mordovian Maniac"; robbed, raped and killed women in Saransk with two accomplices; served sentence in full and released in 2009	
Zaika, Mikhail	1997–1999	4	4+	Released in 2020	Known as "The Soul Collector"; murdered people in Saint Petersburg and Suzdal to cover up his drug lab or to perform Satanic rituals	
Zaikin, Oleg	2001–2006	9	9+	Committed suicide in prison	Known as "The Chernikov Maniac"; committed numerous rapes and at least nine murders in several regions across Russia	
Zakharchenko, Andrei	2000s–2014	11	11	Sentenced to life imprisonment	Known as "The Kartaly Arsonist Maniac"; killed ten acquaintances in Kartaly during petty arguments after being released from a prior murder conviction	
Zamanov, Abdufatto	2002–2004	14	14	Sentenced to life imprisonment	Known as "The Krasnoyarsk Chikatilo"; killed 14 people in Krasnoyarsk for his personal pleasure, as well raping two adolescent girls	
Zamulin, Roman	2006	6	6	Sentenced to life imprisonment	Known as "The Night Carrier"; FSO praporshchik who raped and killed women in Yekaterinburg	
Zastynchanu, Sergey	2004	4	4	Sentenced to life imprisonment	Known as "The Koptevsky Maniac"; killed four elderly women in Koptevo District, Moscow Oblast	
Zhizhich, Alexander	2003	5	5	Sentenced to life imprisonment	Together with his brother, Viktor, killed three people in Vologda, as well as two others on his own in Arkhangelsk	
Zhizhich, Viktor	2003	3	3	23 years imprisonment	Together with his brother, Alexander, killed three people in Vologda	
Zhukov, Vladimir	2002–2006	3	4	Sentenced to life imprisonment	Known as "The Nizhegorodsky Chikatilo"; pedophile who abducted, raped and murdered young girls in Nizhny Novgorod; suspected of other crimes, including an additional murder	
Zhukova, Sofia	2005–2019	3	3	Died before trial	Murdered three people in Khabarovsk with an axe, dismembering their remains afterwards	
Zubov, Denis	2013–2014	3	3	Killed in action	Murdered three people in Volgograd, severing the genitalia of the first two victims	

== Unidentified serial killers ==
Name	Years active	Proven victims	Possible victims	Regions where active	Notes	Ref
Danilovsky Maniac	2004–2007	7	7+	Vologda	Raped and murdered seven young girls and women in Cherepovets; also suspected of murdering a woman in Vologda in 2010, as well as a series of murders of young girls between 1999 and 2003	
Forest Maniac	1993–1997	12	18	Samara	Stalked and killed couples around Samara and its suburbs. A police major was convicted for two of the murders and served a prison sentence for it, but his guilt is disputed.	
Tyumen Maniac	1997–2009	8	8+	Tyumen	Thought to be responsible for the disappearances and murders of children around Tyumen; Vitaly Berezhnoy arrested	

== See also ==
- Lists of serial killers

== Bibliography ==
- Burkhalter Chmelir, Sandra (2003). "Serial Killers". In Robert Kastenbaum (ed.). Macmillan Encyclopedia of Death and Dying. Vol. 2. New York: Macmillan Reference USA/Thomson/Gale. p. 1. Archived from the original on 3 May 2009.
- Morton, RJ (2005). "Serial murder multi-disciplinary perspectives for investigators" (PDF). Federal Bureau of Investigation.
- Hollandsworth, Skip (2015). The Midnight Assassin (1st ed.). New York: Henry Holt. p. 81. ISBN 978-0-8050-9767-2.
- Lane, Brian; Gregg, Wilfred (1995) [1992]. The Encyclopedia Of Serial Killers. New York City: Berkley Book. ISBN 0-425-15213-8.
