= David Sarabashyan =

Russian serial killer

- Born: David Armenakovich Sarabashyan; 1981 (age 44–45); Leninavan, Rostov Oblast, RSFSR
- Other names: "The Suvorov Maniac" "The Rostov Maniac" "The Laskovsky Killer" "The Soldier Strangler"
- Convictions: Murder x5 Rape
- Penalty: Life imprisonment

Details
- Victims: 5
- Span of crimes: 2000 – 2003; 2018
- Country: Russia
- State: Rostov
- Date apprehended: November 2018

David Armenakovich Sarabashyan (Russian: Давид Арменакович Сарабашян; born 1981), known as the Suvorov Maniac (Russian: Суворовский маньяк, romanized: Suvorovskiy manyak), is a Russian serial killer and rapist who killed five women and teenage girls in the Rostov Oblast from 2000 to 2018, most of them while AWOL from the military. He was later convicted on all counts and sentenced to life imprisonment.

== Early life ==
David Armenakovich Sarabashyan was born in the village of Leninavan, Rostov Oblast in 1981, as the older of two brothers from an ethnic Armenian family. The family were well-respected in the area, as Sarabashyan's grandfather was a veteran of the Great Patriotic War and his uncle died on the frontlines during the Soviet–Afghan War. According to former classmates and teachers, Sarabashyan was considered an average student who preferred to keep to himself but displayed great interest in a variety of sports ranging from taekwondo to Greco-Roman wrestling.

In his teenage years, his parents suddenly divorced and his mother moved away to another city. As divorces are rare and looked down upon in Armenian culture, rumours started to spread that Sarabashyan's father was physically abusive towards his mother, which greatly affected the adolescent's psyche. As a result, he became more withdrawn and upon graduating from school, he quickly enlisted to serve in the Russian Ground Forces. As part of his military training, he was assigned on guard duty at a military hospital in Rostov-on-Don.

== Murders ==
=== Serial murders ===
On one night in April 2000, Sarabashyan went AWOL with the intent of going to his house and drinking beer. On the way, he spotted a 27-year-old woman and offered to have a few drinks with her, but was summarily rejected. After the victim turned around, he grabbed a large stone, crept up behind her and hit the victim on the head, knocking her unconscious. He then wrapped a belt around her neck and dragged her to the nearby bushes, where he raped and strangled the victim, before covering the body with garbage and returning to his unit. In October of that same year, he repeated this exact method with another victim, a 32-year-old local woman, whom he knocked out, raped and strangled before again returning to his unit.

While he was questioned as part of a routine police procedure, one of Sarabashyan's fellow officers testified that he never left the camp's grounds - at the time, no one had noticed that he had indeed snuck out. Due to this, he was written off as a suspect. He ceased the murders until November 2001, when he went AWOL again and returned to his hometown of Leninavan, where he came across 16-year-old Knkush Aghababyan while she was returning home from a disco. He raped and strangled her, dumping her body in a nearby field, where it was found by teenagers playing football two days later. Despite extensive searches by both locals and law enforcement, the lack of useful leads resulted in the case going cold. In July 2003, he raped and strangled a 41-year-old teacher on Malinovsky Street in Rostov-on-Don, later dumping her body in an alleyway.

In the aftermath of this murder, Sarabashyan came to be afraid of being caught and decided to stop killing for the time being. For twelve years, he is not known to have committed any violent crime: he married, had children, found a job as a construction worker and lived the life of an exemplary family man in Rostov-on-Don, with nobody suspecting him of the crimes. This changed sometime in 2015, when he randomly attacked a 29-year-old woman, who managed to fend him off and escape. Some passers-by who had heard her screams called the police, who immediately came in and arrested Sarabashyan. While he was released due to the fact that the victim was unable to positively identify him, his fingerprints and personal information were nonetheless entered into the country's criminal database.

=== Murder of Margarita Kuzminova ===
On the evening of 16 October 2018, 25-year-old Margarita Kuzminova went out of her house in Rostov-on-Don, carrying only her cellphone with her. News sources were conflicting as to the reason why, with some saying that it was for grocery shopping while others claimed it was to meet a friend. After failing to answer several of her mother's calls, her parents reported the event to the police, who decided to try and locate her through her phone. The device's geolocation data showed that it was last active near her parents' home, and after this revelation, hundreds of police officers and local volunteers organized a search for her. Several days later, Kuzminova's body was found in a wasteland outside of town, with indications that she had been raped and strangled.

== Arrest, trial and imprisonment ==
For the remainder of the month, investigators worked to solve Kuzminova's murder, interrogating witnesses and investigating any possible suspects. Eventually, a link to Sarabashyan was established via fingerprint evidence from his previous arrest, and he was subsequently brought in for interrogation. Shortly after being brought in, he lost his nerve and readily confessed to the killing. According to him, he was drinking at a bench when he noticed Kuzminova sitting nearby and texting someone on her phone. After making sure that there was nobody around, Sarabashyan sneaked up behind her and wrapped his folded jacket around her face, choking and punching her until she fell into unconsciousness. Upon doing so, he dragged her out of sight to the wasteland, where he raped and strangled her.

While he was initially suspected solely of her murder, Sarabashyan began corresponding frequently with one of the investigators, who eventually led him to confess to the four previous murders. As he provided details that only the real killer would have known, he was subsequently charged with the previous murders as well. As per court procedure, he was ordered to undergo a psychiatric evaluation, which concluded that he was sane but diagnosed as a sexual sadist.

Due to the sheer amount of volumes in the criminal case and the investigation into possible further murders, Sarabashyan's trial was delayed until 2020. At the numerous pre-trial hearings during that time, he repeatedly reiterated his guilt on all charges but also said that he did not regret what he had done. He was eventually put on trial and found guilty on all counts, for which he was given an automatic life sentence. While the verdict was read out, Sarabashyan hid under the hood of his jacket and silently listened, attempting to hide himself from the journalists present in the courtroom. In the aftermath of his conviction, he was transferred to an undisclosed corrective labour colony, where he remains to this day.

== See also ==
- List of Russian serial killers
