= Vladimir Dolin =

Russian serial killer (1983-2009)

- Born: Vladimir Nikolayevich Dolin; 1983; Kopeysk, Chelyabinsk Oblast, RSFSR
- Died: December 25, 2009 (aged 25–26); Kopeysk Prison, Kopeysk, Chelyabinsk Oblast, Russia
- Cause of death: Suicide by hanging
- Other name: "The Kopeysk Maniac"
- Conviction: Murder x4
- Penalty: 8 years and 6 months (1999); Life imprisonment (2008)

Details
- Victims: 3
- Span of crimes: 1999; 2007 – 2008
- Country: Russia
- State: Chelyabinsk
- Date apprehended: December 2008

Vladimir Nikolayevich Dolin (Russian: Владимир Николаевич Долин; 1983 – December 25, 2009), known as The Kopeysk Maniac (Russian: Копейский маньяк), was a Russian serial killer and rapist who killed two girls in Kopeysk in 2007 and 2008, after having been released from a prior murder conviction. Convicted and sentenced to life imprisonment for the latter crimes, he hanged himself in prison a few months into serving his sentence.

== Murders ==
Dolin committed his first severe crime at age 16, when he was convicted of killing an unidentified teenager on hooliganistic grounds. For this crime, he was sentenced to 8 years and six months imprisonment and was released in November 2006. According to psychiatric reports obtained from the institution he was detained at, Dolin was described as "cunning, dodgy, quick-tempered and unbalanced".

After his release, he returned to Kopeysk and lived a relatively normal life for more than a year, but eventually resumed killing again. On December 17, 2007, he was walking down the street when he took notice of 5-year-old Anya Nikitina playing on the street. He approached her on the pretense of helping him search for his lost dog, whereupon he lured her to an abandoned sewage treatment plant. There, Dolin raped and then strangled Nikitina, hiding her body under a concrete structure. He then left the crime scene, but returned later to move the body to a nearby pit.

On July 17, 2008, Dolin was hanging around a reservoir when he took notice of a group of young girls passing by. He approached them and asked one of the girls, 13-year-old Sasha Nikolayzina, if she wanted to accompany him to a nearby convenience store to buy some alcohol and cigarettes. Nikolayzina agreed, but she was instead lured to the sewage treatment plant, where Dolin beat, raped and then strangled her into unconsciousness. Unsure whether she was still alive, he then tossed the body over to a flooded part of the room, where she drowned. In both of these crimes, Dolin undressed the victims and then hid their clothing to prevent identification.

== Arrest, trial, and suicide ==
The two murders remained unsolved until December, when authorities had gathered up enough evidence to charge Dolin with Nikolayzina's murder. After his arrest, he was interrogated by authorities and admitted not only to killing Nikolayzina, but Nikitina as well. In his confessions, Dolin denied that he had sexually abused the girls, in spite of the fact that the known evidence contradicted his claims.

After a psychiatric evaluation concluded that he was sane and did not suffer from any debilitating mental abnormalities, Dolin was charged with two counts of murder and put on trial. Due to the overwhelming amount of evidence against him, he was swiftly convicted and sentenced to life imprisonment in a special regime penal colony.

Dolin spent almost the entire time after his arrest in Chelyabinsk's Pretrial Detention Center No. 1, located on Rossiyskaya Street. He was placed in solitary confinement because authorities feared reprisals against him by other inmates.. Approximately four months after his conviction, on December 25, Vladimir Dolin was found dead in his cell by prison guards. It was determined that he had hanged himself with a washcloth, leaving behind a suicide note in which he stated that nobody else should be blamed for his death.

== See also ==
- List of Russian serial killers
