= Leonid Karnov =

Russian serial killer (born 1976)

- Born: Leonid Vladimirovich Karnov; 1976 (age 49–50); Leningrad, RSFSR (present-day Saint Petersburg, Russia)
- Other names: "The Petersburg Othello" "The Cyclist"
- Conviction: Murder x5
- Penalty: Life imprisonment x5

Details
- Victims: 5
- Span of crimes: 2005–2008
- Country: Russia
- State: Saint Petersburg
- Date apprehended: July 2008

Leonid Vladimirovich Karnov (Russian: Леонид Владимирович Карнов; born 1976), known as The Petersburg Othello (Russian: Питерский Отелло), is a Russian serial killer who killed five people, including a pregnant woman, during robberies in Saint Petersburg from 2005 and 2008. For his crimes, he was sentenced to life imprisonment.

== Biography ==
Little is known about Karnov's life. A native of Saint Petersburg born in 1976, Karnov showed an affinity for cycling at an early age and demonstrated athletic prowess during his school years, so much so that he was considered as a candidate for a "Sportsmaster" award. However, this fell through he started drinking heavily, eventually leading to multiple convictions for theft during the 1990s. He was released in 2000, was unable to find a job and made a living through stealing and reselling bicycles.

On October 28, 2005, while riding on a train on the Saint Petersburg-Lyuban line, Karnov stabbed another passenger with a knife under unclear circumstances. The victim subsequently died from blood loss, but his killer went unapprehended. For the next three years, Karnov is not known to have committed any violent crimes until March 2008. At that time, he was drinking at the Serafimovskoe Cemetery, where he had originally gone to clean the gravestones of his family members, when he was approached by another homeless man. The pair drank together until a quarrel arose between them, during which Karnov strangled the man with his own T-shirt before stealing his bike and mobile phone.

While the police were investigating the first murder, Karnov committed a similar one a month later, again strangling a drinking companion before stealing his bike and mobile phone. Sometime that same month, Karnov was drinking with 23-year-old Nikita Gorbunov, a drinking companion who acted as his accomplice during some of his robberies, when they came across a 37-year-old acquaintance of his, Svetlana Boytsova, on Narodnaya Street. Boytsova, who had recently been divorced and had issues at her workplace, decided to invite the two men to drink at her apartment. After some time, a drunken Karnov strangled his new drinking buddy with a belt and then stole her items, while a terrified Gorbunov watched, unable to do anything due to his own drunkenness and newfound fear of his friend.

On a cold night in July of that year, Karnov was in the rented apartment he shared with his 41-year-old pregnant girlfriend, Kristina Styazhkina, who had allegedly been pestering him to stop drinking and stealing. In the ensuing argument, Karnov grabbed a knife and stabbed her nine times, leaving the weapon jammed in one of her arteries. After washing himself, changing his clothes and going out for a walk, he wound up at the apartment of a female acquaintance, to whom he confessed that he had just killed his girlfriend. Alarmed, she notified police, who arrested him not long after.

During the subsequent interrogations, police extensively questioned the accused killer in relation to the others homicides, after finding mobile phones and other physical evidence that linked them to him. Eventually, Karnov confessed, but struggled to provide a good reason for the crimes, claiming that he was drunk during each attack. After a psychiatric examination determined that he was sane to stand trial, he was charged with the four murders and several robberies he had been linked to at that point. In October 2009, he was convicted on all counts and sentenced to life imprisonment. His accomplice, Gorbunov, was only charged with one count of robbing a cyclist, for which he was convicted and sentenced a year and a half in prison.

In 2010, Karnov was linked to the 2005 cold case by Saint Petersburg authorities, and was subsequently charged with murder. Karnov was convicted for it in December 2010, and was given another life term. He later attempted to appeal the second sentence to the Supreme Court, but his appeal was rejected.

== See also ==
- List of Russian serial killers
