= Vladimir Bratilov =

Russian serial killer (born 1975)

- Born: Vladimir Anatolyevich Bratilov; 2 November 1975 (age 50); Lysva, Perm Oblast, RSFSR, USSR
- Conviction: Life imprisonment

Details
- Victims: 8
- Span of crimes: 1997–1998
- Country: Russia
- States: Lysva, Perm Oblast

Vladimir Anatolyevich Bratilov (Russian: Владимир Анатольевич Братилов; born 2 November 1975, Lysva, Perm Oblast, RSFSR, USSR), known as the "Lysva Maniac", is a Russian serial killer, rapist and robber who committed a series of eight murders of girls and women, accompanied by rape and robbery, between March 1997 and June 1998 in the city of Lysva. In 1999, Bratilov was found guilty of all charges, after which the Perm Regional Court sentenced him to life imprisonment.

== Biography ==
Vladimir Anatolyevich Bratilov was born in 1975 in the city of Lysva (Perm region). He grew up in a complete family and had an older brother. He spent his childhood and youth in a socially prosperous environment. Bratilov's parents led a law-abiding lifestyle and did not have bad habits that negatively affected the life and well-being of the family as a whole. During his school years, Bratilov, due to his introversion, was not very popular among his peers and had the status of a social outcast, which is why his academic performance was low and Vladimir was characterized by the teaching staff as very mediocre. After graduating from school, Bratilov entered one of the local vocational schools, after which he found a job in his specialty at the Lysva Metallurgical Plant. In his free time, Bratilov led an idle lifestyle and was fond of alcoholic beverages. At the end of 1996, 21-year-old Bratilov was arrested for the rape of a minor, but then he managed to reach an agreement with the parents of the victimized girl, and they withdrew the statement.

== Murders ==
Between March 1997 and June 1998, Vladimir Bratilov committed eight murders in Lysva, involving rape and robbery. He chose girls and women of varying ages, ranging from 14 to 70, as his victims. Age, height, weight, hair color, and other physical characteristics were not important to him when choosing his victims. When committing the murders, Bratilov demonstrated his typical behavior pattern. He committed most of his crimes while intoxicated. During the attacks on his victims, he suppressed their resistance by beating them, then subjected them to sexual violence, often in a perverted form, after which he killed them by strangulation and took money and items of material value. The search for the criminal was complicated by the fact that Bratilov's brother was an active law enforcement officer, and he was aware of the progress of the investigation into his own crimes.

== Arrest, investigation and trial ==
On 23 July 1998, Bratilov attacked ambulance worker Natalya Mezentseva, grabbed her and began to strangle her, and then dragged her into the city park. Mezentseva managed to wriggle free, and then Bratilov snatched her bag and threw himself into the bushes. After what happened, the would-be victim ran home and called the police. The girl, together with the operatives, walked around the park and saw the rapist at the exit with her bag, and thus Bratilov was detained. During the investigation, he wrote a confession for eight murders, and things belonging to the victims were seized from his apartment. During the preliminary investigation, Bratilov was imprisoned in Pre-trial Detention Center No. 1 in Lysva. Bratilov actively gave confessions, but showed no signs of remorse, and during one of the interrogations he stated that his victims themselves were to blame for what happened. According to Vladimir, his victims did not take proper precautions and put themselves in danger by appearing in deserted places at night and making no attempt to escape when he began to pursue them.

== See also ==
- List of Russian serial killers
