= Valery Voronov =

Convicted Russian serial killer

- Born: Valery Vladimirovich Voronov; 1958 (age 67–68); Lyuban, Leningrad Oblast, RSFSR
- Other names: The Lyuban Maniac
- Convictions: Murder x3 Rape x4
- Penalty: Compulsory treatment

Details
- Victims: 3+
- Span of crimes: 2005–2007
- Country: Russia
- State: Leningrad
- Date apprehended: 2008

Valery Vladimirovich Voronov (Russian: Валерий Владимирович Воронов; born 1958), known as The Lyuban Maniac (Russian: Любанский маньяк), is a Russian serial killer and rapist who attacked predominantly women in the town of Lyuban, Leningrad Oblast between 2000 and 2007, killing at least three in the process and wounding at least four people. Found not guilty by reason of insanity, he was detained in a psychiatric facility, where he remains to this very day.

== Early life ==
Valery Voronov was born in Lyuban in 1958, growing up in a dysfunctional family where he frequently quarrelled with his father, as a result of which he was brought up by his grandparents. According to rumours circulated after his arrest, Voronov allegedly first felt the desire to kill at age 15, but this hasn't been verified. As he grew older, he married his first wife and acquired a job at the Ministry of Internal Affairs, which required him to move the Far East. While he was working abroad, Voronov's wife distanced herself from him, unwilling to find a job for herself or a personal apartment. Puzzled, Voronov quit his job and returned to Lyuban, whereupon he learned that his wife had given birth to a son, which Valery believed to have been fathered by the neighbour. In response, the couple divorced, but not long after, Voronov remarried and had two more children.

He was regarded as a very polite man and competent electrician by his neighbours, who said that he loved riding bicycles, skiing, swimming and history, especially novels written by Valentin Pikul, but had also amassed a criminal record for minor offences, mostly for failing to pay his alimony. Unbeknownst to those around him, Voronov's mental state had severely deteriorated from the anger and resentment he felt towards his first spouse, and circa the early 2000s, he began to go out in the late evenings on Fridays and Saturdays, searching for victims he could lash out against.

== Crimes ==
The first recorded attack occurred on 6 August 2000, outside the local disco's toilet stalls, when a 42-year-old woman was beaten up with an iron rod and dragged to the nearby bushes, where her attacker attempted to rape her, but was thwarted by passers-by. Despite the attack happening near the House of Culture, this beating was more or less ignored, as such behaviour was considered fairly normal due to the abundance of drunk youths frequenting the discos. While guards were hired, the matter was taken in an irresponsible manner, with the owners refusing to close the establishment for fear it would damage their business.

Two years later, a couple was attacked in a similar manner outside the disco, both of them receiving injuries on the head. On 14 April 2004, an 18-year-old girl was returning home in the early morning after staying at the disco, walking along a bridge overseeing the Tigoda River when she was suddenly attacked and dragged off to some nearby bushes. There, her assailant tore off her clothes and raped her, but again, failed to kill his victim.

The frequency of these attacks led to rumours being spread about a lunatic operating in the area, attacking victims who entered the toilet stalls outside near the House of Culture, a relatively isolated area with no lighting and an abundance of bushes and trees obscuring the view. In April 2005, the city was shaken by the discovery of two heavily bruised girls in the nearby football stadium. Both had been beaten extensively with a cane. While one of the girls survived the ordeal, the other, who had had her clothes torn to shreds and was likely raped beforehand, succumbed to her injuries. After that, the attacks ceased for about a year, until 1 April 2006, when a 21-year-old woman's naked body was found near the toilet stalls. Like the previous victims, she had been raped and tortured, but this time it appeared the suspect had apparently used a glass bottle to kill the victim.

The final murder occurred on 12 August 2007, when 17-year-old Yulia Billevich was struck on the head with an iron bar near the stalls after exiting the disco. She had her jaw broken and suffered extensive injuries to her head, resulting in her dying in the hospital's intensive care unit.

== Arrest, trial and internment ==
The slew of murders outraged the residents of the small town, who demanded that the perpetrator be captured at once. Authorities conducted investigations during which they questioned hundreds of citizens, operating under the presumption that the long gap between the killer's crimes was likely because he was an outsider who visited Lyuban periodically. Much to their surprise, in 2008, several of the surviving victims pointed towards the inconspicuous electrician Valery Voronov as their assailant, resulting in his arrest. During his subsequent interrogations, Voronov fully admitted his guilt about the crimes but was unable to explain why he had done it. In the investigations that followed, he was tested for possible involvement in other crimes committed in Leningrad Oblast, with experts suspecting he might've been involved in more than a dozen attacks. Following a psychiatric examination, it was noted that he appeared extremely nervous when his first wife was brought up, with doctors summarizing that he might've developed a hatred towards women because of his wife's infidelity. Nevertheless, following a court order, Voronov was deemed criminally insane and thus incapable of understanding the gravity of his actions, which led to his internment in a closed psychiatric facility, where he presumably remains to this very day.

Due to public outcry, the stalls outside the disco were demolished by the city administration and all the amenities were moved inside to prevent any further incidents from taking place. A small grave was made for Billevich, where young residents still bring flowers to honour her memory.

== See also ==
- List of Russian serial killers
