= Vladimir Romanov (serial killer) =

Soviet-Russian serial killer and child rapist (1950-2006)

- Born: Vladimir Ivanovich Romanov; 5 December 1950; Orekhovka, Kaliningrad Oblast, RSFSR
- Died: 12 October 2006 (aged 55); Kaliningrad, Kaliningrad Oblast, Russia
- Cause of death: Suicide by hanging
- Other names: "The Kaliningrad Maniac" "The Bagrationvosky Maniac" "The Taxi Driver"
- Conviction: Murder
- Penalty: Died by suicide before he could be sentenced

Details
- Victims: 12+
- Span of crimes: 1991–2005
- Country: Soviet Union, later Russia
- State: Kaliningrad
- Date apprehended: 27 September 2006

Vladimir Ivanovich Romanov (Russian: Владимир Иванович Романов; 5 December 1950 – 12 October 2006), known as the Kaliningrad Maniac (Russian: Калининградский маньяк, romanized: Kaliningradsky manyak), was a Soviet-Russian serial killer and child rapist. Between 1991 and 2005, he committed at least 12 murders associated with rape.

== Biography ==
Romanov lived in the town of Bagrationovsk. In 1991, he committed the double murder of teenage girls whose bodies he later buried. Due to the absence of the corpses, the victims were considered missing and the case remained unsolved. During the same year, he raped a 12-year-old girl and tried to strangle her. The victim remained alive and gave a description of the offender, with Romanov being arrested soon after and sentenced to 10 years in prison. While in prison, he was raped by another inmate. After his release in 2001, Romanov began working as a driver for hire.

In order not to go to prison again, Romanov carefully planned his crimes. His victims were young girls and women between 12 and 19 years, whom he always raped and then killed, either burying the bodies in the forest or sometimes burning them.

On 25 September 2006, he attempted to rape a 24-year-old who managed to escape and remember his car's registration number. Two days later, Romanov was arrested. He immediately confessed to killing a number of girls between 2001 and 2005, a total of 10 murders being established. He also confessed to the 1991 double murder. He once drove a taxi and took a woman who was going on a date half an hour in Калининград. He wanted to murder her and the woman got off 5 minutes after departure and he wanted additional payment, but the woman refused.

=== Victims ===
Romanov described in detail some of the killings. Here are some of his descriptions:

Several years ago, in the afternoon, I was driving a Ford Fiesta or Opel Kadett car on the Kaliningrad-Mamonovo road towards Kaliningrad. Near a village road I saw a girl, about fourteen, walking toward Mamonovo. I offered to give her a lift. I decided that if she got in the car, I would kill her. She agreed to my proposal and said that she was going to Mamonovo. On the way towards Mamonovo, I turned off the road to the right and drove to a deserted place. There, I used a knife to undress her and had sexual intercourse her, after which I killed her, stabbing her in the neck with a knife. The corpse I hid in the bush.

After a while I was driving in a Ford Fiesta or Opel Record car in Dolgorukovo. In the village I saw a girl, about fourteen, standing. I offered to give her a lift. I decided that if she got in the car, I would kill her. She agreed to my proposal and said that she needed go to Dubrovka. I brought her to a deserted place in the area of the village. In Chapaevo, where I killed her, I struck her several times in the neck. The corpse I hid in a ditch.

After a while I was driving a Ford Fiesta car on the Bagrationovsk-Dolgorukovo-Nivenskoye road in the direction of Nivenskoye. On the way, I saw a girl, about fourteen, standing around. I offered to give her a lift. I decided that if she got in the car, I would kill her. She agreed to my proposal and said that she needed to go to Vladimirovo. On the way, before reaching Vladimirovo, I turned off the road to the right, drove into an abandoned garden near the cemetery. There I killed her - strangled with my hands. Also, when I strangled her, I broke her neck. As far as I remember, I did not commit any sexual actions with her, but I do not rule out that I could have done it. The corpse I hid in the garden, in the grass.

== Death ==
Romanov was placed in Kaliningrad's pre-trial detention centre No. 1 and was immediately put in solitary confinement. On 11 October 2006, he confessed to committing a thirteenth murder, the circumstances of which he planned to tell later. However, on the night of 12 October, the 56-year-old rapist hanged himself with his bed sheets, leaving a brief suicide note addressed to his son, in which he apologized to his family.

The investigators suspected that Romanov could be responsible for up to 20 murders.

== In the media ==
- "Hunting for Maniacs" - "Channel First" (2008).

== See also ==
- List of Russian serial killers
- List of serial killers by number of victims
