= Vasily Bolgarov =

Russian serial killer

- Born: Vasily Nikolayevich Bolgarov; 1985 (age 40–41); Gagarin, Smolensk Oblast, RSFSR
- Other names: "The Gagarin Killer" "The Smolensk Strangler" "Kot"
- Conviction: Murder x4
- Penalty: 9 years imprisonment (2005); 25 years imprisonment (2010)

Details
- Victims: 4
- Span of crimes: 2001–2010
- Country: Russia
- State: Smolensk
- Date apprehended: July 2010

Vasily Nikolayevich Bolgarov (Russian: Василий Николаевич Болгаров; born 1985), known as The Gagarin Killer (Russian: Гагаринский убийца), is a Russian serial killer who killed four women in Gagarin and Smolensk between 2001 and 2010. After he was released on parole for a double murder, he proceeded to murder two other women in a few days, but was quickly recaptured. For his new crimes, he was sentenced to 25 years imprisonment.

== Early life ==
Little is known about Bolgarov's early life. Born and raised in Gagarin, he studied up until the 9th grade, after which he quit school due to his poor performance. He never got a job and lived with his parents. At the age of 16, he murdered two women and was imprisoned for the crime for several years. In April 2010, Bolgarov was released on parole and settled in Gagarin with a woman he had met while still in jail. The couple lived by modest means, with most of their income supplied by a cousin of Bolgarov who worked in the United States. Although described as hot-tempered, Bolgarov's girlfriend claimed that he was never violent, and was a kind and cheerful man, known by his affectionate name "Kot". Unbeknownst to her, he contacted various girls on Odnoklassniki using various pseudonyms, whom he would ask out on dates. Two women would respond to his offers, and they would later become his murder victims.

=== Evgenia Shamruk ===
The first woman to respond to Bolgarov was 30-year-old Evgenia Shamruk, a Gagarin local. She was a graduée of the Institute of Arts who worked at a library, and was looking for a boyfriend online. The two began communicating often via Skype, and later on, they exchanged mobile numbers. On July 8, 2010, Shamruk invited Bolgarov over to her house. He came dressed up in a nice suit and with a bouquet of flowers, at first knocking on the wrong apartment before finding Shamruk's. The pair then went on a walk around the city, before they returned to Bolgarov's house, where they chatted and drank wine. Around midnight, he offered to escort her back to her house, which Shamruk accepted. At the house, while searching the cupboards for some tea, Bolgarov noticed a nylon cord on one of the shelves.

He then grabbed Shamruk and tied her up, moving her to a nearby closet, where he subsequently strangled her. After reassuring himself that she was dead, he stole her purse, jewelry, mobile phone and the recently gifted bouquet, then set fire to a sofa and armchair with a flammable liquid. While the apartment was burning down, he calmly left the house, emptied the purse containing 2,000 rubles and threw it beside the road. Bolgarov then went to a pawn shop, where he sold Shamruk's phone for 700 rubles, but decided to keep her bracelet. Returning home, he immediately went back to making appointments with girls, and not long after, another woman contacted him.

=== Anastasia Lukyanova ===
The second victim was a 21-year-old college student and cook named Anastasia "Nastya" Lukyanova, who lived in Smolensk. Kind and shy, but gullible and insecure about her weight, Lukyanova was desperately looking for somebody who could love her for being herself, finding that dream man in the form of "Andrei", a programmer who lived in Gagarin. During this time, her relatives and colleagues noticed that she had fallen in love with a man she had met, but curiously, as per his request, she never showed any pictures of him. Using the fact that her parents weren't in the house and that her grandmother lived in the countryside, Lukyanova invited her supposed lover over to Smolensk on July 14. He came over in the evening and they went to her room, where they talked for about 20 minutes before "Andrei" started asking her for money. Replying that she had none, Bolgarov then grabbed a belt from one of her clothes and strangled Lukyanova on the spot. He then rummaged through the house, stealing every valuable item he could find, including a phone, a camera and some gold, but ultimately failing to locate any money. Bolgarov then called a taxi and was driven to Gagarin, leaving behind the driver a tip of 500 rubles.

== Arrest, trial and imprisonment ==
By the time Lukyanova's body was recovered, there were growing fears that a serial killer was in the area. Authorities interviewed numerous witnesses, including Shamruk's next-door neighbor and the taxi driver, both of whom had seen a suspicious young man accompanying the girls. Not long after, they arrived at Bolgarov's doorstep, and arrested him on charges of killing Shamruk and Lukyanova. Knowing that admitting his guilt would give him a more lenient sentence, Bolgarov readily confessed to the murders. The court convicted him of both murders, and taking into the mitigating circumstances, he was sentenced to 25 years imprisonment, the first 8 of which he would spend in a normal prison and the rest in a maximum security prison colony. In addition, he was ordered to pay 219 thousand rubles in material damages to the victims' families. The parents of the victims protested the sentence, going so far as to petition then-President Dmitry Medvedev to lift the moratorium on the death penalty, but their request went unanswered.

== See also ==
- List of Russian serial killers
