= Andrei Zakharchenko =

Russian serial killer and arsonist (born 1978)

- Born: Andrei Leonidovich Zakharchenko; 1978 (age 47–48); Kartaly, Chelyabinsk Oblast, RSFSR
- Other names: "The Kartaly Arsonist Maniac" "The Pyromaniac Maniac"
- Conviction: Murder x11
- Penalty: Unknown (2000s); Life imprisonment (2016)

Details
- Victims: 11
- Span of crimes: 2000s–2014
- Country: Russia
- State: Chelyabinsk
- Date apprehended: 2000s March 2014

Andrei Leonidovich Zakharchenko (born 1978), known as the Kartaly Arsonist Maniac, is a Russian serial killer and arsonist who set fires around his hometown of Kartaly from the 2000s until 2014, killing 11 people. He was later convicted of these crimes and sentenced to life imprisonment.

== Early life ==
Andrei Zakharchenko was born in 1978 in Kartaly, Chelyabinsk Oblast. His parents were alcoholics who often beat him and did not care about raising him, leaving the young boy to do mostly whatever he wanted. During his school years, he was an outcast and unpopular with girls and was also bullied due to his slim build and short stature. This led to Zakharchenko losing all interest in his studies and receiving mostly mediocre grades.

After completing the ninth grade, Zakharchenko began a life of crime. In the 2000s, he was repeatedly prosecuted for theft and once for murder, for which he served a prison sentence. After his most recent release, Zakharchenko struggled to find employment due to his prison record and resorted to working in manual labour and stealing to survive.

== Murders ==
=== 2011 quadruple murder ===
Zakharchenko committed his first murders on the night of 11 to 12 May 2011. The day before, he went to the apartment of his friend Vyacheslav Bondar to celebrate his birthday. Other guests present were Yevgenia Shandolinova, Zakharchenko's ex-wife, from whom he had separated a few months earlier; Zakharchenko's infant daughter; and Shandolinova's mother, Natalia. For several hours, all of the guests spent time drinking alcohol, and around the early evening, Zakharchenko left the apartment. On his way home, he realized that he had forgotten his cellphone and decided to return; however, he decided to sneak in so he could also steal some items from the place.

After waiting until nightfall, Zakharchenko approached the apartment and climbed up to the second floor via a gas pipe. At that time, everybody inside was asleep, so Zakharchenko took his cellphone and stole 60 rubles and a pair of women's shoes. Fearing potential repercussions and having grudges against his ex-wife and friend, he doused the wall with flammable liquid and set it on fire—the fire quickly spread and killed all of the occupants. Zakharchenko managed to escape by climbing down the pipe.

Smoke coming out of the apartment was soon noticed by some neighbors, who immediately called the police. After extinguishing the fire, officers found four bodies, all of whom died from carbon monoxide poisoning. It was quickly established that the fire was set deliberately, and due to being present at the celebration, Zakharchenko was immediately suspected. However, while reviewing the surveillance footage installed in front of the house, investigators only saw footage of him leaving the residence a few hours prior to the fire, leading to Zakharchenko being dismissed as a suspect at the time.

=== Further crimes ===
In September of the same year, Zakharchenko committed another arson in order to kill a woman he disliked. After making sure that the woman and her grandmother were asleep, he set fire to the house's roofing, but the victims awoke in time and extinguished it.

Zakharchenko's next murder occurred in September 2012. The victim was a middle-aged acquaintance whose identity was never established. While the two men were drinking, they got into a quarrel during which Zakharchenko struck him numerous times using his hands, feet and a stone, causing the man to lose consciousness. He then threw the man into an earthen pit but then noticed that he was still showing signs of life—he then climbed down and kicked him in the head before covering the pit with garbage and branches and fleeing. The victim later succumbed to the injuries and suffocated from the garbage piled on top of him. After the attack, Zakharchenko stole DVDs and a bicycle from the victim.

The final murders occurred on 25–26 March 2014. On that night, he went to a house on Pionersky Lane to visit a longtime acquaintance, where he eventually got into an argument with her because she rejected his romantic advances and allowed a friend of hers to insult him. Angered by this, he came back later in the night while the acquaintance and the friend, as well as three children aged 5, 9, and 11, respectively, were all sleeping. Zakharchenko managed to get into the hallway of the house, after which he doused various objects with flammable liquid and set fire to them. Due to the fact that the house was dilapidated and wooden, the fire quickly engulfed it from the outside and inside, after which Zakharchenko fled. As a result, all occupants were asphyxiated to death from the flames.

== Arrest, investigation and trial ==
During the investigation into the 2011 mass murder, investigators linked it to another arson and eventually to Zakharchenko, who was acquainted with all the victims. Soon afterwards, a friend of one of the women informed the police that the deceased had had an argument with Zakharchenko, after which he was arrested.

Zakharchenko immediately admitted responsibility for all of the murders and actively cooperated with the officers but showed no remorse and sincerely believed that all of his victims deserved to die because of the insults hurled at him. As part of the investigation, more than 50 witnesses were interviewed and more than 25 forensic examinations were conducted, resulting in him being charged with multiple counts of murder, attempted murder, destruction of property, arson and unlawful entry.

After he was ruled sane to stand trial, Zakharchenko was brought to trial. During the proceedings, it was reported that he laughed when the charges against him were read out. On 29 February 2016, the Chelyabinsk Regional Court found him guilty on all counts and sentenced Zakharchenko to life imprisonment. In addition, he was ordered to pay 2.5 million rubles to the victims' family members and an additional 470,000 rubles for property damage. All of his appeals were denied by the Supreme Court, and he is now serving his sentence at a special regime colony.

== See also ==
- List of Russian serial killers
