= Viktor Fokin =

Russian serial killer

- Born: Viktor Viktorovich Fokin; 19 February 1935; Orsk, Novosibirsk Oblast, RSFSR
- Died: 2003; Angarsk Colony, Angarsk, Irkutsk Oblast, Russia
- Other names: "The Pensioner Maniac" "The Grandfather Ripper"
- Conviction: Murder
- Penalty: 19 years imprisonment

Details
- Victims: 10+
- Span of crimes: 1996–2000
- Country: Russia
- State: Novosibirsk
- Date apprehended: March 2000

Viktor Viktorovich Fokin (Russian: Ви́ктор Ви́кторович Фо́кин; 19 February 1935 – 2003), known as The Pensioner Maniac (Russian: Маньяк-пенсионер), was a Russian serial killer who killed at least 10 people in between 1996 and 2000.

== Biography ==
Fokin was born in 1935. After graduating high school, he went to serve in the army, and began working at the Novosibirsk Semiconductor Devices Plant after his discharge. Fokin was a leader, and later became a labour veteran. In the later 1950s, he married and had children. His life turned around abruptly in 1988 when his wife died. By this time Fokin had aged considerably and suffered from hearing loss, but had a great potency that attracted women to him. During this period, he tried to improve his personal life, but then began to have sex with prostitutes, tramps and alcoholics. But by the mid-1990s, Fokin became impotent, a factor which greatly worried him.

== Murders ==
The first murder Fokin committed was in April 1996 (according to some sources in December 1995). He killed mostly women aged between 18 and 55 years, but the age did not matter much. As victims, he chose women and girls without a specific place of residence, mostly alcohol abusers and prostitutes, the choice being explained by the fact that nobody would look for these people if they disappeared. Fokin confessed that he asked his future victims for any relatives, and, as a rule, chose single women. Indeed, the remains of all nine known victims of Fokin were never identified and it was not possible to identify any of his ten known victims. The murder scenario was always the following: Fokin got acquainted with the victim in the Railway Square, brought them home, where he raped and mercilessly killed them. The murder methods were always different: some were strangled, others were drowned in the bathroom, and some were stabbed. After the death of each victim, Fokin dismembered the corpse and threw it in the garbage container.

The last murder Fokin committed was on 5 March 2000. Having dismembered a corpse in the bathroom, as was he modus operandi the remains were thrown into a trash container on Timiryazev Street near his home.

== Discovery and arrest ==
A man reported finding a bloody bag of sugar with human organs to the Zaeltsovskoye Police Department. Operative-search activities were carried out with an incredible scope: in the area where the dismembered body was found, hundreds of houses and thousands of apartments were inspected, there was intensive work with witnesses, and external surveillance and ambushes were organized. Fokin was detained between 7 and 15 March 2000. When his house was searched, a lot of female items were found. At the first interrogation, he confessed to all his crimes.

== Trial and sentencing ==
The trial of Viktor Fokin took place in May 2001. The prosecutor demanded 20 years imprisonment. However, Fokin was sentenced to only 19 years imprisonment in a corrective labour colony, where he died two years later.

=== In the media ===
- In the programme "Five Stories" from the series Escape from the maniac (9 April 2009), Fokin's case was mentioned.

== See also ==
- List of Russian serial killers
- List of serial killers by number of victims
