= German Christan =

Convicted Russian serial killer

- Born: German Lyubomirovich Christan; 1986 (age 39–40); Kostroma Oblast, RSFSR
- Conviction: Murder x5
- Penalty: 9 years, commuted to 8.5 (first murder); Life imprisonment (later murders)

Details
- Victims: 5
- Span of crimes: 2003; 2014 – 2017
- Country: Russia
- States: Kostroma, Leningrad
- Date apprehended: September 27, 2017

German Lyubomirovich Christan (Russian: Герман Любомирович Христан; born 1986) is a Russian serial killer. First convicted for murder as a minor, he went on to kill four other people after his release between 2014 and 2017, burning his victims alive. For the later crimes, Christan was convicted and sentenced to life imprisonment.

== Early life and first murder ==
German Christan was born in 1986 in a small village in the Kostroma Oblast. When he was still a young boy, his parents divorced and his father left for Leningrad Oblast, while Christan and his mother remained in Kostroma. While his mother would occasionally intoxicate herself with alcohol, she was still regarded as caring, and her sudden death caused her then-14-year-old son to be devastated by the loss. German was initially put into an orphanage, but he escaped and wandered back to his native village, where a 70-year-old woman took pity on him and decided to shelter him. Christan lived with her for several months, but one day in December 2003, he tried to steal some potatoes and jam, but was caught in the act. In retaliation, he raped his elderly caretaker before killing her and then setting her body on fire. He was arrested not long after, and the Kostroma Oblast Court sentenced him to 9 years imprisonment in a prison colony, where authorities believed he would straighten himself out. The sentence would eventually be reduced to 8.5 years imprisonment.

== Release and new murders ==
In December 2011, Christan was released after serving out the entirety of his sentence. Apparently set on starting a new life, he tracked down his father to the village of Proba in Leningrad Oblast, where he had married a second time. His father accepted him, allowing German to reside in the family's bathhouse. Christan, unwilling to find himself a job, survived by collecting and selling scrap metal, as well as stealing from fellow villagers. In February 2013, he was sentenced to a year of imprisonment for death threats and assault causing bodily harm.

In early January 2014, he was released from prison and returned to Proba, where he began hanging around 57-year-old Vladimir K., a fellow ex-con he had befriended sometime after moving to the village. The men would occasionally engage in scuffles, mostly due to Christan's habitual thefts, but would nevertheless reconcile afterwards. On January 4, 2014, while the two were binge-drinking, German and Vladimir began arguing again, during which the latter mentioned that he knew what the former had done. Despite his angered state, Christan abstained from harming Vladimir, as his 14-year-old daughter and her boyfriend were visiting the house at the time. He left and then returned the next evening, finding his friend drunken and in a deep sleep. Little by little, Christan stole every item he could get his hands on, ranging from stereo systems to ragged clothes, and brought them to his bathhouse. After satisfying himself with the amount of stolen goods, he returned to Vladimir's house and doused his clothes in cold water. He then set the entire house ablaze and sat down next to Vladimir, who was still sleeping, watching as his friend slowly burned to death without regaining consciousness. When the flames got too intense, he jumped out of the window, just as the firefighters had arrived on the scene. He was interrogated by the firemen, who asked him questions, but Christan claimed that he had been sleeping in a nearby empty house whose owner had gone to Vsevolozhsk. While his fellow villagers suspected Christan of being behind the arson, his claims weren't questioned, and law enforcement wrongfully concluded that Vladimir had suffocated from smoke inhalation in his drunken state. At the time, Vladimir's daughter snuck into Christan's house some time after her father's death, where she saw that Christan had stolen multiple items from the burned house, but didn't report it to the police because she was afraid of what could possibly happen to her.

The next incident occurred in early April 2016, when Christan visited Alexei Emelyanov, another friend of his with whom he had previously resided with, but was eventually kicked out due to their frequent quarreling. Despite leaving on bad terms, Emelyanov agreed that they could share a drink together and invited Christan to his bathhouse. Once there, both men began drinking when German suddenly got angry and attacked his companion, knocking him to the ground and sitting on top of his chest. Emelyanov pretended to be unconscious, successfully leading to Christan getting up, stealing his laptop and then promptly leaving the area. Believing that he would sort it out in the morning, Emelyanov went to bed without calling the police. Shortly afterwards, however, he woke up to find his clothes burning while Christan was laughing at him. Alexei ran out of the house and stripped off his clothes as quickly as he could, managing to extinguish the flames, but suffered numerous burns on his body for which he later had to receive medical treatment. Christan was only charged with stealing the laptop, as Emelyanov refused to press charges, with the pair cutting off contact completely.

On the early morning of September 27, 2017, firefighters were alerted that a one-story house and two sheds were burning in Proba. They quickly traveled to the indicated location and extinguished the flames, where they found three bodies: the couple that occupied the home (aged 54 and 56), as well as a 90-year-old disabled grandfather. Forensic experts who were present at the scene immediately noticed that the couple had been stabbed, while the elderly man, who was unable to get up due to his health condition, had died from smoke inhalation.

== Arrest, trial and imprisonment ==
While they were still trying to deal with the fire, firefighters met with a peculiar obstacle: one of the homeowners, German Christan, stood in the doorway to the burning house because "he wanted to get a better look". He was arrested for interfering, but after it was learned by the other villagers' testimony that Christan and the deceased victims had problems resulting in death threats, specifically about a 300-ruble debt that the former owned and never returned, the police decided to search Christan's house. When they did so, they discovered the victims' stolen moped, as well as blood stains on Christan's black jacket, which he hadn't bothered to wash since he believed the stains weren't noticeable.

Christan was taken to the police station, but denied his guilt in the murders, despite the overwhelming evidence against him. While investigating his past, the authorities recalled the mysterious death of Vladimir K. in 2014, who had died in suspiciously similar circumstances. The evidence from that case was reexamined, and the detectives reclassified it as murder, as a closer look revealed that the fire had been started deliberately, not accidentally as it was previously believed. During court testimony, multiple witnesses who had previously been afraid to come forward, such as Vladimir K.'s daughter and Alexei Emelyanov, testified about what they had seen, both pinning Christan as the assailant in their respective cases.

In order to determine his sanity, Christan was ordered to undergo a psychiatric exam, but while the doctors diagnosed him with unspecified mental abnormalities, their overall conclusion was that he was fully aware of what he had done and understood the gravity of his actions. And thus, shortly after this verdict, Christan was found guilty of four murders and sentenced to life imprisonment in a strict-regime penal colony. The Deputy Prosecutor for the Leningrad Oblast, Mikhail Ustinovsky, even demanded that the killer received the death penalty due to the severity of his crimes, stating that he would be incapable of reentering civilized society if released.

== See also ==
- List of Russian serial killers
