= Yuriy Sushko =

Ukrainian serial killer

- Born: Yuriy Volodymyrovich Sushko; 1979 (age 46–47); Kherson Oblast, Ukrainian SSR
- Other name: "The Homeless Killer"
- Conviction: Murder
- Penalty: Life imprisonment

Details
- Victims: 5
- Span of crimes: 2013–2015
- Country: Russia
- State: Tula
- Date apprehended: 2015

Yuriy Volodymyrovich Sushko (Russian: Юрий Владимирович Сушко, Ukrainian: Юрій Володимирович Сушко; born 1979), known as The Homeless Killer (Russian: БОМЖ-убийца, Ukrainian: Вбивця бездомних), is a Ukrainian serial killer. Between 2013 and 2015, he killed four men and his female roommate in alcohol-related quarrels in the Russian town of Uzlovaya, Tula Oblast, burning their corpses afterwards. In 2017, he was sentenced to life imprisonment for his crimes.

== Early life ==
Native to Ukraine's Kherson Oblast, Sushko had a rough childhood - when he was just a year old, his parents divorced. His mother remarried, taking young Yuriy with her and renaming him so he could have his stepfather's surname. After some time, the family moved to Russia, deciding to settle in Tver, where they lived an ordinary and modest life. According to Sushko, however, that all changed one fateful night: when he was seven, he was having a snack in the kitchen, when his mother entered with a glass of milk, followed by his stepfather, who carried an axe. Assuming that it was for chopping firewood, Yuriy's stepfather hit his mother on the head, causing her to collapse on the ground, wheezing for breath. The man hit her a second time, before proceeding to fully decapitate her. After finishing his act, he ran out in the street, got on a motorcycle, went to the police and gave himself in. When the investigation was completed, he was returned to his father in Ukraine, who by then had also remarried and had two other children.

Following the tragic event, Yuriy's personality shifted to that of an aggressive child, often cursing his stepmother and running away from home, reportedly even drinking and smoking like an adult man. His father, intolerant of his behaviour, sent him to a boarding school for mentally disabled children, which, although it didn't cure him of his aggressiveness, made Yuriy study harder. As he was considered a threat to other patients, Sushko was sent off to a psychiatric hospital, where he was diagnosed with schizophrenia. From this point on, his life went down a steep hill, with Yuriy being imprisoned for the first time at age 14. This was followed by many others, all for theft. While in the prison colony, he admittedly used various types of drugs, including heroin, amphetamine and other "funny pills".

== Murders ==
=== Vasily Smirnov ===
Having served out his sentence at the Novomoskovsk colony and unable to return to his homeland, Sushko wandered into Uzlovaya on October 12, 2013, where he quickly found a source of alcohol and housing: an abandoned non-profit partnership named "March 8". After buying himself some booze, he wandered off again to another house, where he saw 24-year-old Vasily Smirnov sleeping on a mattress. Despite Smirnov's rather greasy and unkempt appearance, Sushko offered him a drink and some snacks, and the two began conversing about life. At one point, the conversation steered into the peculiar tattoos that Yuriy had on his arms, with him admitting to being recently released from jail. Suddenly, Vasily started swearing at him and hit Sushko twice in the face. Angered, Sushko grabbed a metal pipe and hit Smirnov three times on the head, cracking open his skull.

After realising what he had done, Sushko decided to cover up the crime. He dragged Smirnov's body back on the mattress and lit it on fire, making it appear as if the deceased had accidentally lit himself on fire with an unextinguished cigarette. Although it didn't have enough time to burn, Smirnov's hands and head were severely disfigured, enough so that the medical examiner was unable to decipher the cause of death.

=== Vladimir Antipov ===
Once he left the colony, Sushko started a relationship with a homeless woman named Olga Belova. Her house had burned down, and with her husband dying in the fire, she was unable to care for her son, who was sent away to a boarding school. Because of his criminal record, Sushko couldn't get a job, so he worked as a labourer to scrape every ruble he could get.

Sometime in 2014, while the two were out "shopping" for moonshine, Belova came across an old acquaintance: 50-year-old Vladimir Antipov, who was unfamiliar to Yuriy. Olga asked to take Vladimir with them, to which Yuriy agreed. Once at home, the couple laid the table with alcohol and food and set a bonfire on the street. While they were at their gathering, Antipov made a comment about how men had dragged Belova out into the bushes, to which Yuriy replied that he better leave to not catch her eye. Suddenly, Vladimir rushed at him, and the two started fighting. Quickly assessing his situation, Sushko grabbed a nearby shovel and hit Antipov several times, causing him to fall and lending Yuriy enough time to rush back into the abandoned house. After some time, he came out and found that Antipov had died.

Deciding to hide the body again, utilizing Olga's help, Yuriy decapitated the body with a hacksaw, put it in a bag and threw it into some nearby bushes, before also disposing of the body in a nearby drainage ditch. He later burned the shovel and sold the hacksaw for scrap metal. If neighbours from nearby dachas asked questions about the putrid smell, Sushko explained it away with the excuse of a dog that had died in the bushes.

=== Olga Belova ===
After noticing that around one and a half thousand rubles of his had gone missing, Sushko became suspicious of his girlfriend, and on 22 January 2015, he beat her severely. Olga spent some time lying in the hospital with broken hands, and even though a criminal investigation was started against Yuriy, she returned to him after she was discharged. Around May, while they were sitting and drinking together, Sushko told Olga that if she needed money, she first had to own up to what she had stolen. Belova instead replied that she was leaving him and that she would also expose him for Antipov's killing. Now angered, Yuriy attacked Olga, but she temporarily slipped away. He managed to catch up with her, proceeding to hit Belova a total of 40 times before returning to the house. After some time, he returned to the crime scene, where he found that Olga had died from her wounds.

Using his usual method, Sushko got some gasoline, bundled some sticks on the body and set it on fire. He kept the fire going all night by adding more sticks and pouring some alcohol from time to time. In the morning, he disposed of the remaining bones by burying them.

=== Igor Mironov ===
The next two victims, as Sushko described it, were killed "by accident". The first was 32-year-old Igor Mironov (named 'Alexander' in some media sources), whom he had met at a store while buying alcohol. The two men had a drink together behind a garage, with Mironov stating that he had defrauded a thousand rubles, offering to briefly return home to get his card and get them more booze. Incapable of refusing such an act, Sushko agreed, and later invited Mironov to his house. Yuriy and Igor engaged in a friendly conversation while eating some fried chicken wings until Mironov saw that his host had an Orthodox icon on the wall. Suddenly, Mironov got agitated and started making strange noises, saying that the devil would come. With futile attempts to calm him down, Yuriy found himself grappling with the crazed Mironov. Acting on instinct, he grabbed a nearby metal bar and struck Igor on the head several times. Mironov, wheezing, soon dropped dead on the ground. Coming to the realization that this was the fourth victim already, Sushko decided to simply throw the body into the bushes. He told of the killing to some friends, and when inquired as to his reason behind it, he simply said: "He was drunk. It was all the same."

=== Vladimir Korolev ===
At the end of June that same year, Sushko invited another man into his house to drink: 24-year-old Vladimir Korolev (named 'Nikolai' in some media sources). While they were chatting, Korolev mentioned that he had also been in the Novomoskovsk colony, and then started raving about how Yuriy had treated him unfairly. Puzzled by his claims, Sushko tried to calm him down, but their conflict soon turned into a physical one. Having predicted the outcome, Sushko grabbed a brick and crushed it into Korolev's skull. While he tried to burn the body, starting with the legs, he got tired and went to sleep. On the following morning, when Sushko saw Vladimir's corpse, he realized that he had done it again. In order to conceal it, he dragged the body into a nearby dacha and sprinkled it with garbage to hide it.

== Arrest, trial and imprisonment ==
The murders remained unsolved for some time, but would soon come to an end with Sushko confessing his deeds. Suspicions fell on him for Mironov and Korolev's killings, and while walking towards his house, he stumbled upon Officer Denis Kazakov and his partner. Kazakov, who was familiar with Yuriy because of his mishaps and disrupting public order, brought him to the department for interrogation and started asking questions about the two missing men. Much to the two officers' surprise, Sushko offered to write a confession and further admitted to killing Smirnov, Antipov and Belova. His claims were proven when he explained how he killed, and pointed out where the gravesites were. Because some of the deceased lacked muscle tissues and limbs, some suspected that Sushko might've engaged in cannibalism. At a later point, Yuriy contended that he did everything in self-defence, drawing a comparison between him and the Uzbek mass murderer Sirojiddin Sherilev, among whose victims were three children.

I'm tired of turning the other cheek all my life and living according to the laws of God. I fought with men, they could defend themselves. These were not the children whom Sheraliev killed.

At trial, Sushko did many things to attract attention, changed his testimony and claimed that he was forced into confessing, saying that "the more corpses, the better". He denied any previous accusations, particularly the ones about cannibalizing his victims, and explained away his odd behaviours while out in the streets (baptizing trees, showing off karate techniques, dancing in the streets and stripping himself) as a combination of alcoholism and his schizophrenia. This was shot down by Justice Marianna Boldova, who said that many people with this ailment were upstanding citizens. Despite the severity of his crimes, he was recognized as sane, and in 2017, Yuriy Sushko was convicted of the five murders and sentenced to life imprisonment. While in jail, Sushko claimed that he was writing a book on how to solve the Russo-Ukrainian war, and that he was also applying for Russian citizenship. He also said that he'd be willing to atone for his sins by joining the volunteer forces to restore peace in his home country.

== See also ==
- List of Russian serial killers
