= Vyacheslav Yaikov =

Kyrgyzstani-born Russian serial killer and rapist

- Born: Vyacheslav Viktorovich Yaikov; 1 March 1974 (age 52); Kalininskoye, Chuy Region, Kirghiz SSR
- Other name: "The Kopeysk Strangler"
- Conviction: Murder
- Penalty: Compulsory treatment

Details
- Victims: 6
- Span of crimes: 2002–2003
- Country: Russia
- State: Chelyabinsk
- Date apprehended: 18 September 2003

Vyacheslav Viktorovich Yaikov (Russian: Вячесла́в Ви́кторович Я́иков; born 1 March 1974), known as The Kopeysk Strangler (Russian: Копейский душитель), is a Kyrgyzstani-born Russian serial killer and rapist. He committed 6 murders on sexual grounds between 2002 and 2003. The Chelyabinsk Regional Court found Yaikov guilty and sentenced him to compulsory treatment.

== Biography ==
Yaikov was born in Kyrgyzstan, and was diagnosed with an intellectual disability in his childhood. In 2002, he got involved in drug smuggling, but, as he was mentally ill, he was released from criminal liability with a referral to compulsory treatment. After his discharge, he settled himself as a laborer.

In October 2002, near a gas station, he committed his first murder; he killed a woman by strangulation. On 1 May 2003, in a garage cooperative, he killed another girl, with another murder following only three weeks later. Forensic examination revealed that all three victims at the time had been in a state of intoxication. Later it turned out that one of the victims had agreed to drink alcohol with the killer. Yaikov knocked out his victims with blows to the face, then dragged the women into the bushes where he raped and strangled them to death. (Supposedly, he raped them after the murder.) On the night of 25 May 25, on the territory of a kindergarten, he raped and killed two graduate schoolgirls. Subsequently, the killer said that he had wanted to get acquainted with the girls, but when they refused, he attacked them. Later it turned out that the locals heard screams at night, but did not call the police, assuming that the schoolchildren were just celebrating their graduation. After the murder of the schoolgirls in the city, people started worrying about the murders in their vicinity.

On 18 September, Yaikov killed another girl. Local residents, hearing the victim's cries, called the police. The same day, the killer was detained. He was hiding in a tree near the crime scene, where he was found by operatives. Yaikov immediately confessed to all the murders, detailing every crime. In addition, his involvement in past crimes was proven by examination results. However, his defence party demanded to exclude Yaikov's testimony from the case, insisting that they give him the insanity defence.

=== Trial ===
In July 2004, an expert opinion was given, according to which Yaikov "presents a special danger to society, and therefore requires compulsory treatment in a psychiatric hospital of a specialized type with intensive supervision." In February 2005, the Chelyabinsk Regional Court decided to send Yaikov to compulsory treatment, followed by a psychiatric examination, which would determine if the defendant was sane at the time of the crimes. However, the Supreme Court's cassation instance overturned this decision. In the beginning of 2007, because of the prolonged investigation, the time expired for the criminal procedure legislation to keep the defendant in custody. Yaikov was released under a written undertaking not to leave the place.

In the same year, as part of investigative measures, with the permission of the prosecutor's office, he was sent to the Serbsky Center in Moscow. The experts found that Yaikov "poses a special danger to society and needs compulsory treatment", but did not answer - was Yaikov insane at the time of the crimes or did his psychiatric disorder come later? In another year, Yaikov was undergoing treatment, before passing a second examination at the Serbsky Center. Experts concluded that at the time of the crimes, Yaikov was insane. On 11 September 2008, the Chelyabinsk Regional Court found Yaikov insane and sent him to compulsory treatment in a psychiatric hospital with intensive supervision.

== See also ==
- List of Russian serial killers
