= Sergey Kuznetsov (serial killer) =

Russian serial killer (born 1974)

- Born: Sergey Vladimirovich Kuznetsov; 1974 (age 51–52); Kuybyshev, Kuybyshev Oblast, RSFSR (present-day Samara, Samara Oblast, Russia)
- Other names: "The Kryazh Maniac" "The Kryazh Poisoner" "Junkman"
- Conviction: N/A
- Penalty: Involuntary commitment

Details
- Victims: 6–8
- Span of crimes: 2007 – 2008 (confirmed); 2005 – 2008 (suspected)
- Country: Russia
- State: Samara
- Date apprehended: April 4, 2008

Sergey Vladimirovich Kuznetsov (Russian: Сергей Владимирович Кузнецов), known as The Kryazh Maniac (Russian: Кряжский маньяк, romanized: Kryazhsky manyak), is a Russian serial killer who poisoned six people in Samara from 2007 and 2008, and is additionally suspected of two earlier murders.

Judged incompetent to stand trial, he was instead interned at a psychiatric institution, where he remains to this day.

== Early life ==
Born in Kuybyshev in 1974, Kuznetsov grew up in a normal family with his older brother, but from an early age showed signs of mental illness and was described as withdrawn. At the age of 14, together with his brother, the pair robbed and assaulted a cab driver - for his role in the crime, Sergey was interned at a psychiatric institution. In 1992, Kuznetsov was arrested for attempted murder, but was again ruled unfit to stand trial and put into an institution for treatment. In the following years after his release, he is not known to have committed any crimes.

Kuznetsov lived in the Kirzavod area of the Kuybyshevsky City District, and also owned a garage and dwelling in the village of Kupino. A pathological hoarder, he was unemployed and spent a lot of his time rummaging through garbage dumps looking for large quantities of worn-out clothes, glass bottles and other junk. Throughout all this time, his mental health state gradually worsened.

Neighbors and casual acquaintances were mostly wary and even afraid of Kuznetsov, with most avoiding him due to his odd behavior and "creepy" look. He was noted for always walking around with a checkered bag, a red scarf and a fur hat.

== Murders ==
Kuznetsov committed his first crime in late September 2007 - he approached a man named Igor Petrov at a bar and asked for some money for alcohol, which Petrov gave him. After going first to the bar and then back to his house, Kuznetsov returned carrying his signature bag and handed Petrov a bottle of beer, supposedly to thank him for his generosity. Petrov - who was already slightly inebriated - drank about half the bottle before being knocked out. Kuznetsov then dragged him to an isolated area, stripped him down to his underwear and stole all his clothing. Petrov was found not long afterwards and driven to a hospital, where the doctors concluded that he was poisoned.

Over the next few months, Kuznetsov killed six people in an identical manner - he chose middle-aged or elderly men, often intoxicated, whom he met on the streets. He would offer them alcohol spiked with Azaleptine, and when the victims were rendered unconscious, Kuznetsov would drag them to the "Volgar" state farm, where he robbed and strangled them, abandoning the bodies in a forest belt. He would then steal small sums of money, clothes, cell phones and documents, which he would store in his apartment in a pile of garbage.

The murders occurred on November 30, 2007 (Mr. Samylin); December 14 (Alexander Oreshkin); December 19 (Mr. Chernyshov); December 20 (Mr. Alekseev); December 29 (Mr. Pudovkin) and January 2008 (Mr. Deinekin). Most of the victims' first names were not revealed, except for Oreshkin, the second chronological victim. The investigators rather quickly linked all the criminal cases into one, and a special investigative unit was formed to solve them.

== Arrest, investigation and internment ==
Kuznetsov initially turned off one of the cellphones stolen from the victims, but after some time, he decided to give it to his girlfriend Olga Tabachkova without removing the SIM card. Soon afterwards, the wife of the missing man called the phone number, only for Tabachkova to answer - this allowed police to trace the call and question her. Tabachkova then directed them to the house in Kirzavod, where she lived with Kuznetsov and another woman, Maria Tareeva. When queried, Tareeva revealed that Kuznetsov hoarding various items he supposedly stole from people and told them about the apartment in Kupino.

After his arrest, the residence was searched, where a number of personal items belonging to the victims were located, including a stack of passports - some of which were covered in blood. In addition to this, investigators also found documents belonging to two other men who were killed in Samara, but did not charge Kuznetsov with these murders due to a lack of strong evidence. Despite this, investigators theorized that he killed these two men between 2005 and 2006, supposedly with the help of two accomplices named "Andrey" and "Vova". Kuznetsov himself initially denied responsibility and claimed that he found them at a landfill, but eventually confessed.

On May 6, 2009, his trial began. Initially, Kuznetsov was ordered to undergo a forensic psychiatric evaluation at a hospital in Kazan, where he was ruled to be sane. However, this verdict was accepted by neither the prosecution nor defense, and he was thus transferred to the Serbsky Center. Soon afterwards, he was diagnosed with a volatile form of schizophrenia that rendered him incapable of understanding the gravity of his crimes. Not long after this, he was temporarily incapacitated and was interned at a closed psychiatric institution.

When his treatment concluded, he was again transferred to a pre-trial detention center in Samara. At trial, Kuznetsov said that he simply hated people who drink. On November 17, 2011, at the end of the trial, Kuznetsov was found guilty of six murders, three robberies, aggravated injury and theft, but was nonetheless acquitted by reason of insanity and placed in a specialized psychiatric hospital with intensive supervision.

== See also ==
- List of Russian serial killers
