= Maxim Nazarenko =

Russian serial killer

- Born: Maxim Borisovich Nazarenko; 6 June 1968; Taganrog, Rostov Oblast, RSFSR
- Died: 7 October 2014 (aged 46); Taganrog, Rostov Oblast, Russia
- Cause of death: Gunshot wounds
- Conviction: Armed robbery
- Penalty: 9 years imprisonment (2001)

Details
- Victims: 11+
- Span of crimes: 2010–2014
- Country: Russia
- State: Rostov
- Date apprehended: 2001 (armed robbery); Died prior to apprehension (murders)

Maxim Borisovich Nazarenko (Russian: Максим Борисович Назаренко; 6 June 1968 – 7 October 2014) was a Russian serial killer who murdered at least 11 elderly people in his hometown of Taganrog from 2010 to 2014.

After he was identified as the prime suspect, police officers attempted to arrest him, but Nazarenko started firing at them, leading to him shot in response.

== Early life ==
Maxim Nazarenko was born on 6 June 1968 in Taganrog. He started showing signs of concerning behavior at an early age, as he often bullied other children and was frequently disciplined in school. As a high school senior, Nazarenko assaulted one of his teachers by pouring boiling hot water on her. After that, he was sent to a psychiatric clinic – while he was found sane, psychiatrists established that Nazarenko was irritable, egocentric and uncaring towards others.

Upon graduating from high school in 1986, Nazarenko was drafted into the Soviet Army, where he was ordered to retake the psychiatric exam. There, he was diagnosed with an antisocial personality disorder and discharged from military service on medical grounds.

=== Early crimes ===
In the late 1980s, following the enactment of the Law of Cooperation and the flourishing of the cooperative movement, whose protection rackets and extortion brought in large profits, Nazarenko began spending a lot of his free time in the company of criminals, with him eventually turning to doing crimes as well.

Throughout the 1990s, Nazarenko lived in poverty and earned a living through theft, extortion, and robbery, in addition to developing addictions to alcohol and drugs. In 2001, he was arrested and convicted of a robbery charge, for which he was sentenced to serve 9 years imprisonment at the IK-1 GUFSIN colony in Zverevo. While incarcerated there, he was reviled by the prison staff for his sadistic tendencies, his emotional outbursts, refusal to work, manipulative behavior and blackmailing other inmates. Nazarenko refused to interact with the staff or apply for parole.

After serving out his sentence in full, Nazarenko was released in early 2010 and returned to Taganrog, where he lived in his mother's house for a while. Some time later, he moved out and settled in a friend's garage in Gukovo, where he isolated himself from others and refused to work. In late 2010, after experiencing financial difficulties, Nazarenko decided to earn a living by stealing, after which he moved back to Taganrog.

== Murders ==
=== Modus operandi ===
Between 2010 and 2014, Nazarenko murdered at least 11 elderly people in and around Taganrog, following a particular modus operandi. He acted with extreme caution and calculation, exclusively targeting residents living in dachas on the edge of the streets, so that in case he was caught in the act, he could have multiple escape routes.

Before each attack, he would stalk the victims for some time and observe them, studying their daily routines and habits and analyzing how many people came in and out of the home. If he found the place suitable, Nazarenko would break in through a window or by kicking in the front door. While carrying out the crimes, he always wore gloves, and afterwards would change his clothing and shoes.

When he was not stalking the victims, Nazarenko studied the geographical layout of the area and all routes leading to the victim's home, all the while attempting to avoid CCTV cameras and potential witnesses. Owing to his carefulness, he managed to avoid detection for almost four years by leaving almost no clues for the investigators. The murders themselves were carried out in a brutal manner, always involving stabbing the victim multiple times in the face, neck, and chest using the same knife.

Reportedly, after each murder, Nazarenko would return to the crime scene and watch the investigators from afar.

=== Serial murders ===
Nazarenko's first known murder occurred on 25 December 2010, on Nizhnaya Linia Street, where he murdered an 82-year-old man and his 69-year-old wife by stabbing them multiple times in the necks and chests. He then stole a gold chain and 2,000 rubles from the home.

His second murder took place on 4 June 2011, when he broke into another dacha on 18th Artillery Lane and killed a 51-year-old woman. He then ransacked the home and stole a laptop, a mobile phone and 5,000 rubles, with Nazarenko selling the laptop and phone at a market in Rostov. On 16 August, Nazarenko stabbed to death a 66-year-old pensioner at a house on Pushkinskaya Street, stealing a laptop, a mobile phone and 10,000 rubles from there.

His next murder took place on 17 October, on Voskova Street. After breaking in during the night, he attacked a 70-year-old woman, stabbing her several times in the neck, chest, and head. When he searched the house afterwards, Nazarenko found nothing of value and left empty-handed.

On 5 December, Nazarenko broke into the dacha of a 76-year-old woman who lived alone on 5th Novy Lane. He then stabbed her to death, inflicting numerous knife wounds to her head and chest before stealing a mobile phone and 70,000 rubles from the house, which the victim had been saving for a trip to Jerusalem.

On 16 August 2012, Nazarenko broke into a house on 11th Novy Lane, where he killed a 74-year-old man and his 74-year-old wife. He then stole a mobile phone, two gold rings, and 50,000 rubles. On 3 September 2013, he broke into another house on Torgovaya Street at night, stabbing the 75-year-old pensioner living there multiple times in the head and neck. After killing her, Nazarenko stole a mobile phone and some kitchen utensils.

Nazarenko's last confirmed murders exactly a year after his last one, on 3 September 2014. On that day, he broke into a dacha on Oktyabrskaya Street, where he went to the garage and found a safe with weapons. After opening it, he took out a sawed-off shotgun and went inside the house, where he shot and killed a 62-year-old man before going into another room and stabbing his 55-year-old wife to death. Fearing that the gunshot would attract attention, he ransacked the home in a hurry, stealing a mobile phone and some gold jewelry. Unbeknownst to Nazarenko, he accidentally left his fingerprints on one of the pieces of furniture.

== Investigation and death ==
While investigating the latest murders, officers discovered the fingerprints. After analyzing them, they were found to be a match to Nazarenko. They immediately went to search for him at his mother's house, but when they realized that he was not there, an arrest warrant was issued for him. Further investigation revealed that he was actually living in his friend's garage.

On 7 October 2014, the garage was searched by a team of spetsnaz officers, but Nazarenko was not there. Officers then combed the area, finding him hiding away in some bushes nearby. He was ordered to surrender, but Nazarenko instead opened on them, managing to wound one. The soldiers returned fire, killing him on the spot.

During the subsequent inspection of the garage, officers found the murder weapons, a collection of knives, construction gloves, a large number of mobile phones and personal belongings of the victims, which were later positively identified by their relatives. These items were then analyzed for a potential link between the crimes, with particles of blood and sweat being found on some of them, allowing for DNA to be extracted.

Genetic testing conducted on the isolated DNA was linked back to Nazarenko and some of the victims. In April 2015, the criminal cases of the 11 murders were closed, with the authorities concluding that Nazarenko was the sole perpetrator responsible for their deaths.

== See also ==
- List of Russian serial killers

== In the media and culture ==
The episode "The Postman Rings Twice" (Russian: Почтальон звонит дважды) from the TV series "True Detective" (Russian: Настоящий детектив) was loosely based on Nazarenko's crimes.
