= Roman Barkovsky =

Russian serial killer and rapist

- Born: 1983 (age 42–43); RSFSR
- Other name: "The Cemetery Maniac"
- Conviction: Murder x3
- Penalty: 24 years imprisonment

Details
- Victims: 3
- Span of crimes: 2008–2009
- Country: Russia
- State: Rostov
- Date apprehended: August 31, 2009

Roman Yevgenyevich Barkovsky (Russian: Роман Евгеньевич Барковский; born 1983) is a Russian serial killer and rapist who raped at least four women in Rostov-on-Don and the village of Kazachiy Yerik between 2008 and 2009, killing two of them. He was sentenced to 24 years imprisonment for these crimes, and seven years later, he would be connected to another unsolved 2008 rape-murder. However, his sentence remained unchanged despite this new revelation.

== Murders ==
Born in 1983, Barkovsky, a married man with a son, worked as a gravedigger in Rostov-on-Don's northern cemetery. On March 30, 2008, he abducted 16-year-old Marina Rachkovskaya while she was walking home from the Stroygorodka district. He brutally raped and beat the girl, before finally strangling her to death and disposing of her body in a drainage ditch along Taganrogskaya Street, under some train tracks. By that time, the local media were reporting extensively on the disappearance, and many searches were organized to find Rachkovskaya. About three months after the fact, her decomposing body was found by some passers-by. When the details of her brutal killing were circulated by the media, it frightened Barkovsky. In the following month, unaware that there were undercover officers out to catch him, Barkovsky approached one female operative and put a screwdriver to her chest in attempt to accost her. The woman managed to shout for backup over the radio, and the officers detained the man for questioning. However, due to the lack of evidence, he had to be released.

After laying low for a while, Barkovsky decided to commit crimes elsewhere. He bought a used Lada and periodically travelled to the villages of Rogozhkino and Kazachiy Yerik, near Azov, where he normally went fishing. Along the road connecting the two locations, there was a bar where young people often gathered and partied at a nearby farm, and knowing this, Barkovsky decided that this would be his new hunting grounds. In July 2009, he abducted a local woman from Kazachiy Yerik and dragged her to a nearby grove, where he stripped the victim of her clothing and raped her. Since she didn't resist, Barkovsky spared her life, leaving in his car after the act. Frightened, the woman told her husband, but they were reluctant to notify the police, as they were afraid of being stigmatized.

In August, a young local girl named Elena also disappeared while walking along the route in Kazachiy Yerik, in a remarkably similar fashion to how the surviving victim was abducted. After prolonged searches, her naked body was found hastily buried in a field. She too had been beaten, raped and sexually assaulted before death. Barkovsky had likely killed her elsewhere, and later transported the body in the trunk of his car.

== Arrest, trial and imprisonment ==
Unbeknownst to the killer, a trio of local farmers had paid close attention to the car that Elena was last seen boarding, even remembering that the license plate ended in 011. Soon after, Barkovsky was detained at a traffic stop for marijuana possession and held for questioning, and when the news of a detained suspect was spread, the surviving rape victim finally came forward and positively identified him as her assailant. Despite his futile attempts to deny and shift the blame on his friends, Barkovsky's alibi was proven to be fake, with semen traces from him also located on the corpses.

At his trial, during which his young son was present, it took the judge less than half an hour to announce a guilty verdict. Much to the dismay of the victims' families, he was given a sentence of 24 years and 7 months imprisonment, of which the first seven he would spend at a prison colony and later a maximum security penal colony.

=== Link to 2008 murder ===
In 2016, as a result of examining cold case murders in Rostov-on-Don and the surrounding areas, investigators connected Barkovksy to an unsolved rape-murder that took place in the city. On the night of March 1–2, 2008, he came across a woman walking home on the street, whom he grabbed, violated and then transported to the Nightingale Grove, where he proceeded to strangle the victim to death.

== See also ==
- List of Russian serial killers
