= Vladimir Kuzmin (serial killer) =

Russian thief and serial killer (born 1965)

- Born: Vladimir Ivanovich Kuzmin; 14 September 1965 (age 61); Moscow, RSFSR, Soviet Union
- Other name: Syosvoski
- Convictions: Murder, manslaughter
- Penalty: Life imprisonment

Details
- Victims: 7–20
- Span of crimes: June – September 1997
- Country: Russia
- State: Moscow

Vladimir Ivanovich Kuzmin (Russian: Влади́мир Ива́нович Кузьми́н; born 14 September 1965) is a Russian thief and serial killer, who in the early 1990s was involved in various crimes against minors, murders, and manslaughter.

== Biography ==
Kuzmin was born on 14 September 1965, in Moscow, living alone with a sick mother. He began stealing at the age of 10, and at 12 he had several convictions for vagrancy. When he was at home, instead of caring for his blind mother, he stole money, starved and beat her when she attempted to shame him. Because of this, at the age of 14, he was sent for three years to the Kashirskaya special school, where children from dysfunctional families and juvenile criminals were kept.

Returning from the special school in June 1982, he already knew he wouldn't be living according to the laws or standards of society. To counter this, he committed several robberies of apartments, choosing those that were on the first and second floors, where it was possible to get into from a window. Kuzmin would then sell the stolen goods. In September of the same year, he was detained and sentenced to 7 years imprisonment in a youth detention centre with a strict regime. There, he was raped multiple times. In order to raise his authority, he chose weaker inmates and treated them in the same way as he was being treated. Once, for no particular reason, he splashed hydrochloric acid into another prisoner's face, blinding him, for which Kuzmin received another 5 years.

== Escape and second capture ==
In the spring of 1993, when there was just over a year left before the end of his prison term, Kuzmin escaped from prison. After escaping, he immediately arrived in Moscow, but as his mother had died, the apartment was taken by the state. In mid-April 1993, he met a 13-year-old boy named Denis Kalistratov near the Tsaritsyn orphanage, who was as lonely and dependent as Kuzmin himself was. Having promised to treat him with beer, he took the boy to a construction site, where he offered to perform oral sex. The boy refused, but Kuzmin then put a knife to the boy's throat, and so Kalistratov agreed. This was the first encounter between Kalistratov and Kuzmin, with Denis eventually coming to terms with his lot and beginning to live with his older suitor. At the end of May, Kuzmin brought another boy, with whom he committed lewd acts with the help of threats. But the boy managed to escape, went to the police and Kuzmin was subsequently detained.

== New crimes ==
In June 1997, he returned to Moscow, as the only person he was connected to was Kalistratov. He visited an address at Shipilovskaya Street to find the Kalistratovs no longer lived there. After inquiring with neighbours he managed to locate Kalistratov's new address and was informed that Kalistratov now lived alone since his alcoholic mother had died and both of his brothers were imprisoned. However, Kalistratov actually lived with a girl, whom he planned to marry in the future. Kuzmin immediately demanded that he break up with the girl, threatening to reveal Kalistratov's past. Kalistratov was forced to end the relationship, and Kuzmin moved in with him. Soon Kalistratov said that he did not want to have homosexual relations with him, and Kuzmin offered a deal: they would stop this kind of relationship, but in return, Kalistratov would become an unquestioning acquaintance in Kuzmin's affairs.

On 2 July 1997, Kuzmin met a 15-year-old boy named Yuri G. Yuri admitted that he did not have enough money to spend like most of his peers, and instead invited the boy to his house for some vodka, making sexual advances afterwards, to which the boy refused. Then Kuzmin took him to the bathroom, struck him twice with a knife and raped the boy. When Kalistratov returned, he offered to finish the boy off by strangling him with a cable. They then got rid of his corpse at a barn near the Borisov Pond by burning the body.

Soon after, the duo committed another murder in a similar manner: on 30 August, they met a 15-year-old named Vladimir V., with Kuzmin explaining that he was setting up a car unloading team and offered Vladimir V. a job. The boy agreed, and an appointment was made for the next day at Kalistratov's apartment to "discuss details". When Vladimir V. got there, he was raped by Kuzmin and then suffocated with a pillow by Kalistratov, his body was subsequently thrown into the Moskva River.

Kalistratov eventually fled, and the rest of the murders, in which most were sexually motivated, were committed by Kuzmin alone. In total, he confessed to 11 murders - 3 minors, 5 men and 3 women, seven of which were proven. The bodies of the four missing men (his possible victims) were not found, although Kuzmin indicated the places of the murders.

== Arrest and trial ==
In the Borisov Pond, the body of a young man was found. The authorities identified him late in the evening as a 15-year-old by the name of Vladimir K., who had been away from his home for two days, thanks to overlaps and recent events. He was last supposed to visit the apartment of a friend named Denis Kalistratov on 25 September 1997, who had promised to sell him marijuana. Surveillance was established behind the apartment, and soon two minors, Artyom Malinin and Valery Vassiliev, appeared near the residence. They claimed that for two weeks they couldn't locate Kalistratov, and he was soon detained. First of all, the authorities checked the apartment and found blood in the bathroom. However, the examination showed that Denis' prints were left two weeks ago, and the blood was still fresh. Kalistratov soon confessed Vladimir Kuzmin had a second set of keys for the apartment. Finding that a cousin of his lived in Moscow, the investigators located and subsequently detained Kuzmin.

His trial began in 1999, and he was subsequently convicted of murder, rape and a number of other crimes. He was sentenced to life imprisonment, of which the first 5 years he spent in prison, and the remaining years in a special regime Penal colony

== In the media ==
- A documentary by the TV series "Kriminalnaya Rossiya"(Criminal Russia) entitled The last will not"The Last Will Not" (1998) was filmed. At the time of filming, he was not sentenced yet.
- A maniac by the name of Kuzmin, played by Arsen Bosenko, appears in the TV series "The Return of Mukhtar" in the "Origami" series, where he kills young women with dark hair and leaves paper origami birds on the crime scene.

== See also ==
- List of Russian serial killers
- List of serial killers by number of victims
