= Vladimir Usov =

Soviet serial killer and rapist

- Born: Vladimir Aleksandrovich Usov; 1957; RSFSR
- Died: 2006 (aged 48–49); Kazan, Russia
- Other names: "The Boy Hunter" "Psycho"
- Conviction: Murder
- Penalty: Compulsory treatment

Details
- Victims: 4
- Span of crimes: 1974–1975
- Country: Soviet Union
- State: Samara

Vladimir Aleksandrovich Usov (Russian: Влади́мир Алекса́ндрович У́сов; 1957 – 2006), known as The Boy Hunter (Russian: Охотник на мальчиков), was a Soviet serial killer who raped and killed four little boys. One of the youngest serial killers in Russian history (he committed his first murder at 17 years of age), he was declared insane and spent 30 years in psychiatric hospitals.

== Biography ==
Usov grew up in a drinking family. From the 5th grade, he dropped out of school unexpectedly, claiming that he had heard some voices that told him not to go to school. His parents took him to a psychiatrist, who diagnosed him with paranoid schizophrenia. Thus, at the age of 14, Usov received two disability groups and a small pension.

At the age of 17, the voices began to call for Usov to perform acts of a pederastic nature. The first murder he committed occurred in Kuybyshev on 1 August 1974, when an 8-year-old boy named Boris, who had been missing since 30 July, was killed. On that day, the boy was playing in the courtyard of his house when a man in a sports suit came up to him and suggested going to a nearby forest to collect nuts. No one else saw the boy after that. This was the coroner's report:

A corpse of a boy aged 7-10 years with signs of a violent death and sodomy was found in a forest massif two kilometres from the administrative village. In the course of the initial examination, traces of strangulation were found on the corpse...

After that, Usov killed three more boys. After the murder of 7-year-old Valery in Tolyatti, a witness reported seeing suspicious people who made strange signs to each other. Rehearsing this version, the senior inspector of the Criminal Investigation, Gronid Simakov, entered the company of several homosexual people. The murder of two of the victims was initially attributed to the physics teacher Petr Popov. He willingly took the blame, wishing to die, because during the investigation his sexuality was revealed, wrote a death letter and twice tried to hang himself in his cell. While studying Popov's testimony, Simakov realized that the suspect was innocent, and informed the authorities about this. Employees of the criminal investigation department had already reported to Moscow about "exposing" Popov and began to pressure Simakov, threatening him with court, and he was removed from office. However, Simakov stood his ground, and it was impossible to condemn the innocent Popov.

The last murder Usov committed was on 17 June 1975, in the Goreliy Khutor village. After raping and strangling a child, he collected a heap of dry brushwood, flanked the boy's body with it, and set it on fire. He was arrested soon after.

On 1 June 1977, the Kuybyshev Regional Court ruled that Vladimir Usov be sent to compulsory treatment in a psychiatric clinic. For 18 years he was kept in a specialized clinic in Kazan, and then transferred to a clinic in Samara, where he managed to escape from in 1996. He kidnapped two boys whom he was going to kill, but was too afraid. The next day he was captured and sent to the Kazan clinic for especially dangerous insane people, where he died in 2006.

=== In the media ===
- Documentary film from the series "The investigation was conducted..", titled "Psycho"

== See also ==
- List of Russian serial killers
