= Ruslan Shishikin =

Imprisoned Russian serial killer

Ruslan Shishikhin
- Born: Ruslan Faatovich Shishikin; 1989 (age 36–37); Kazan, Tatar ASSR, RSFSR
- Other names: "The Yudino Maniac" "The Yudino Murderer"
- Conviction: N/A
- Penalty: Involuntary commitment

Details
- Victims: 3
- Span of crimes: 2006–2007
- Country: Russia
- State: Tatarstan
- Date apprehended: 22 April 2007
- Imprisoned at: Federal State Budgetary Institution "Kazan Specialized Psychiatric Hospital with Intensive Observation", Tatarstan

Ruslan Faatovich Shishikin (Russian: Руслан Фаатович Шишикин; born 1989), known as The Yudino Maniac (Russian: Юдинский маньяк), is a Russian serial killer who murdered two women and a young girl in Kazan between 2006 and 2007. Following his arrest, Shishikin was brought to trial but was found to be unfit to stand trial and instead sent to a psychiatric facility specialized type.

== Biography ==
=== Early life ===
Little is known about Shishikin's upbringing. Born in Kazan in 1989, he began showing signs of a mental illness at an early age, and because of this, he was repeatedly examined at various mental institutions and consulted by psychiatrists. Despite this, his condition didn't improve, and over the years, neighbours of the Shishikin family frequently reported how he would attack his stepfather with a knife. As a result, his parents rented another apartment in the same building, and left him to live on his own. Not long after, Shishikin began to hear voices in his head, which instructed him to attack bystanders on the street, and thus, a series of murders occurred in Kazan.

=== Murders ===
On 17 September 2006, the 17-year-old Shishikin grabbed a knife and began roaming the streets of Kazan, finding himself in the Yudino microdistrict. On Revolutsionnay Street, he came across 27-year-old Natalya Obrubova, who was walking with her child. To the shock of nearby passengers, Shishikin lunged at her and stabbed the woman through the heart with the knife without saying a word, killing her on the spot. After killing Obrubova, he quickly ran away from the scene. While several people attempted to catch up to him, he managed to get away.

Shishikin struck again on 12 January 2007, when he attacked 45-year-old Milyausha Makarova, an employee at the Federal Penitentiary Service, near Serov Street in Kazan. He raped her and then stabbed her to death with the same knife he had killed Obrubova with, before fleeing the scene.

His final and most brutal murder occurred three months later in Yudino, on 22 April. On that day, Shishikin's 8-year-old neighbor, Anya Yurasova, was climbing up the stairs of their apartment building, because she was afraid of using the elevator by herself. When she reached the fourth floor, Shishikin suddenly grabbed the girl and dragged her to his apartment, where he proceeded to sexually assault her. Then, he stabbed her a total of 112 times with his knife and hit her on the head with a blunt object, before finally cutting her throat near the entrance. After he had definitively killed the girl, Shishikin left the body on the stairway between the third and fourth floors and returned to the apartment, where he proceeded to calmly clean up all of the blood. After he had finished, he left to visit his parents.

=== Arrest, trial and detention ===
In the meantime, a neighbour found the mutilated body and alerted the other residents, who in turn called the police. By the time the authorities had arrived, nearly everybody living in the apartment block - including Shishikin - had gathered to learn what had transpired. The case was very quickly resolved, as the operatives had brought a police dog along with them, which quickly led to Shishikin's apartment. While examining it, they noted the strong smell of bleach in the apartment, as well as the suspicious behaviour of its owner. Finally, operatives found smeared blood stains on Shishikin's bed, which proved to them that he was the likely killer. As a result, he was arrested on the spot and brought to the police station for further interrogation.

During said interrogation, Shishikin explained that he had been hearing voices for some time, and that on this day, they had instructed him to kill little Anya. Much to the investigators' horror, he then calmly explained that he had committed the two previous murders, which until then had been considered separate cases. Shortly after these revelations, Shishikin was ordered to stand trial, in spite of being registered at several psychiatric institutions and a preliminary examination diagnosing him with schizophrenia. In the end, he was deemed unfit to stand trial and incapable of understanding the gravity of his actions, and transported to a psychiatric hospital in Kazan, which specializes in treating patients who are considered dangerous threats to those around them.

== See also ==
- List of Russian serial killers
