= Sibirtsevo =

Coordinates: 44°26′N 132°44′E

Sibirtsevo (Russian: Сиби́рцево) is an urban locality in Chernigovsky District of Primorsky Krai, Russia.

== History ==
Originally named Manzovka (Манзовка), Sibirtsevo was renamed after Vsevolod Sibirtsev, Sergey Lazo's companion in arms, in 1972.

Sibirtsevo's population was 8,735 (2010 census); 9,451 (2002 census); 11,697 (1989 Soviet census).

== Transportation ==
Sibirtsevo is a large railway station on the Trans-Siberian Railway.
