= Vasily Khiletsky =

Ukrainian-Russian serial killer

- Born: Vasily Vasilyevich Khiletsky; 30 April 1967 (age 59); Zarechnoye, Crimean ASSR, Ukrainian SSR
- Conviction: Murder x3
- Penalty: 25 years imprisonment (2009); Life imprisonment (2013)

Details
- Victims: 3–5
- Span of crimes: 2006 – 2009 (confirmed); 1980s–2009 (suspected)
- Country: Russia, possibly Soviet Union
- States: Moscow, possibly Crimea
- Date apprehended: January 2010
- Imprisoned at: Black Dolphin Prison, Sol-Iletsk, Orenburg Oblast

Vasily Vasilyevich Khiletsky (Russian: Василий Васильевич Хилецкий, Ukrainian: Василь Васильович Хилецький; born 30 April 1967) is a Ukrainian–Russian serial killer who committed at least three murders in the Moscow Oblast from 2006 to 2009, and is a suspect in two murders in his native Crimea.

His case is noted for the fact that he blamed two Belarusian citizens for one of his crimes – as a result, they were tortured into confessing by Russian officers and wrongfully convicted. After his arrest, Khiletsky was identified as the true killer, convicted, and sentenced to life imprisonment, while the two men were released.

== Early life ==
Little is known about Khiletsky's childhood and youth. He was born in 1967 in the village of Zarechnoye, in Crimea's Dzhankoi Raion, into a family of ethnic Ukrainians. He grew up in a stable home with his sister, but after graduating from high school, Khiletsky struggled with work and started abusing alcohol. This led to him being repeatedly incarcerated by the authorities, who also suspected that he was involved in two murders, but were never able to charge him.

Around the turn of the 1990s, Khiletsky immigrated to Russia and settled in Moscow, where he made a living through low-skilled labor and theft, spending most of his free time among fellow alcoholics and small-time criminals. In the early 2000s, he got a job at the 342 MZ Factory, a concrete manufacturing plant based in the Domodedovsky District, where he was characterized positively by his employer.

When his crimes began, Khiletsky was registered as a resident of Podolsk, despite court records stating that he was homeless. It is also known that he was married, and had a daughter.

== Murders ==
=== Galina Goshovskaya ===
On 26 August 2006, Khiletsky finished his shift at work and decided to drink alcohol with two colleagues – 31-year-old Sergey Khitrik and 45-year-old Vyacheslav Belevich, both of whom were Belarusians from Baranovichi. After drinking for some time in the factory's break room, the men ran out of booze, after which Khiletsky and Khitrik decided to go to the store to buy some more. After purchasing several bottles of vodka, they headed back to the break room, but on the way, Khiletsky spotted a couple having a picnic at the edge of the forest. Deciding that he wanted to get to know them, Khiletsky remained with them while Khitrik returned to the break room.

After introducing himself to the couple – two employees of a local construction company named Viktor Sharovarov and Galina Goshovskaya – Khiletsky offered to drink with them. While conversing with them, Khiletsky decided that he wanted to rape Goshovskaya, offering repeatedly to have sex with her, which she flatly refused. Undeterred, he started sexually harassing her, drawing the ire of Sharovarov, who decided to stand up for his wife. Unable to overpower the man, Khiletsky rushed to the factory's fire axe case to retrieve the axe inside.

Returning to the couple in an enraged state, Khiletsky swung at Sharovarov, striking him three times on the head with the back of the axe. Sharovarov lost consciousness during the assault, leading Khiletsky to believe that he had killed him. He then turned his attention to Goshovskaya, whom he proceeded to rape. After he was done, Khiletsky hit her six times with the back part of the axe on the face, killing her on the spot. He then left the crime scene, leaving behind a used condom.

==== Framing of Khitrik and Belevich ====
After committing the murder, Khiletsky decided to pin the blame on Khitrik and Belevich because he disliked both of them. At the time, the two men had fallen asleep in the utility room and were unaware of what had happened. According to eyewitness accounts, Khiletsky ran to the security post near the factory's entrance and shouted that the "Belarusians are raping and killing people", claiming that he had "found" the corpses of a young couple.

The guards immediately called the police, who arrived soon after and combed the area, but promptly left because they were unable to find the bodies due to the twilight. After a while, Sharovarov managed to regain consciousness and crawl towards the same security post, after which the police were notified again. By that time, Khiletsky had left the area, but based on his testimony, the officers instead arrested Khitrik and Belevich while they were still sleeping. Both men were then taken to the police station, where they were subjected to beatings, electric shocks, were starved and threats from the officers that would "cripple them" for three days straight. In the end, Khitrik signed false confessions and admitted to the crime, but Belevich refused to do so.

Later on, both Khitrik and Belevich would give their account of what happened in an interview with journalists from Moskovskij Komsomolets. Khitrik stated that he was shocked with electricity and told that he would be buried by the roadside like a beggar. On the other hand, Belevich was taken out of the city, tied to a tree and beaten, all the while the officers responsible pretended to shoot him with their service weapons. He also stated that the officers threatened to rape him, and that he would be starved behind bars.

==== Prosecution ====
While examining the crime scene, the investigators ignored the used condom containing Khiletsky's DNA, as a result of which it was never taken into evidence. At the same time, Sharovarov fell into a coma and was unable to explain what had happened. Ultimately, Khitrik was charged as the main perpetrator of the rape and murder, while Belevich was charged as his accomplice. The case was sent to court based solely on Khitrik's testimony, state prosecutors ignoring allegations of torture and police misconduct all the while. At trial, prosecutor Kirill Naumchev built the entire case strictly on the provided materials without further investigation.

As it later transpired, after his colleagues were arrested, Khiletsky returned to the utility room, stole their personal belongings and decided to "lay low" for a while, leaving Russia and returning to Crimea, where he had numerous relatives and acquaintances. He bought a train ticket and managed to reach the Belgorod Oblast, but was soon confronted by several officers and asked to accompany them to the police station. To his surprise, he was brought in by the same officers that had tortured the confession out of Khitrik, and was there to testify against the two Belarusians. He then recounted his fake version of events and told the officers that he had seen Khitrik and Belevich murder the couple, after which he was let go.

==== Erroneous convictions and exoneration ====
At the end of 2006, both Khitrik and Belevich were found guilty of the murder by the Moscow Regional Court, and each was sentenced to 15 years imprisonment. Belevich was then transferred to serve his sentence at a correctional facility in his native Belarus, where he suffered from a stroke. Khitrik contracted an active form of tuberculosis in a Russian penal colony and was isolated from his family members, all of whom believed that he was guilty.

After being discharged from the hospital, Sharovarov continued to have serious health issues, lost the ability to speak, and later died in early 2007 in the care of some relatives in the Rostov Oblast.

Following Khiletsky's arrest and exposure as the true killer, both Khitrik and Belevich were acquitted and financially compensated with 800,000 and 600,000 rubles, respectively. This decision was successfully appealed later on, and both men were each awarded 2 million rubles in compensation. Khitrik later moved to Minsk, where he found work at the Minsk Automobile Plant, while Belevich now lives off of disability pensions, as his stroke rendered him unable to work as a professional driver.

In 2013, a criminal case was opened against the two former police officers for abuse of power – however, one of them managed to avoid charges, while the fate of the second one, Yevgeny Burykin, is unknown.

=== Podolsk double murder ===
After Khitrik and Belevich's trial, Khiletsky resumed living his life as if nothing had happened. In the late 2000s, he got a job at a transportation company in Podolsk, but continued his criminal activities by burgling into private homes and apartments. In these acts, he was aided by two accomplices – Moldovan nationals Eugeniu Kushnir and Igor Odadgiu, who robbed and sold stolen goods with him.

On 8 October 2009, the three men broke into a cottage in Podolsk inhabited by a 25-year-old woman, her 55-year-old mother, and a 4-month-old baby girl. The robbers decided to target this residence because they believed the family had hidden a large sum of money somewhere. During the raid, Khiletsky accosted and sexually assaulted the younger woman, then beat her to death with an axe in front of her mother. He then turned onto the older woman, crushing her head with the axe while Odadgiu was holding her by the legs to prevent her from escaping. After killing both women, they ransacked the cottage and found the hiding spot, stealing a total of 300,000 rubles. As in the previous case, Khiletsky left behind a used condom containing his semen near the younger woman's body as a calling card.

== Investigation and arrest ==
Shortly after the double murder, Khiletsky was immediately considered a suspect and placed under constant surveillance. His sister inadvertently helped investigators by boasting that her brother was smarter than all of them and that he had escaped prosecution for a murder before. This prompted investigators to review old case files, leading them to discover that he was a witness to a strikingly similar crime three years prior.

Eventually, officers recovered files from the Goshovskaya case and requested that the evidence be re-examined with the help of DNA testing, including the used condom, which was originally supposed to be destroyed but was ignored by the bailiffs. As a result, the laboratory located biological samples on Goshovskaya's body that matched Khiletsky, not Khitrik or Belevich. As a result of these findings, Khiletsky was arrested in January 2010.

During interrogations, Khiletsky was informed that he was being charged not only with the double murder in Podolsk, but also the 2006 rape-murder of Galina Goshovskaya. He vehemently denied guilt, even when he was presented with irrefutable evidence, and instead resorted to writing complaints that the evidence was fabricated and that he was being framed by the security services.

== Trial and imprisonment ==
After he was found sane to stand trial, Khiletsky was charged with multiple counts of murder, rape, robbery, and theft. In early 2012, he and his two accomplices were found guilty on all counts concerning the Podolsk crime, for which Khiletsky was sentenced to 25 years imprisonment in a strict-regime penal colony. For their roles in the crime, Kushnir and Odadgiu received 7 and 14 years, respectively. All three filed appeals to the Supreme Court, but they were all rejected in April of that year.

Following the conclusion of the Podolsk trial, Khiletsky was charged with the rape and murder of Goshovskaya. On 12 November 2013, he was found guilty of rape, murder, and the attempted murder of Viktor Sharovarov, for which he was sentenced to life imprisonment. He was then transferred to serve his sentence at the Black Dolphin Prison, where he remains to this day.

== See also ==
- List of Russian serial killers
- List of miscarriages of justice
