= Kegashbek Orunbayev =

Kyrgyzstani-Russian serial killer, rapist and necrophile

- Orunbayev in 2024
- Born: Kegashbek Shamshievich Orunbayev; 14 July 1962 (age 64); Kirghiz SSR
- Other name: "The Ivolginsky Ripper"
- Conviction: Murder x5
- Penalty: 8 years imprisonment (second murder); Life imprisonment x2 (other murders)

Details
- Victims: 6
- Span of crimes: 1991 – 1997; 2007 – 2012
- Country: Russia
- States: Altai, Buryatia
- Date apprehended: September 24, 2012
- Imprisoned at: Black Dolphin Prison, Sol-Iletsk, Orenburg Oblast

Kegashbek Shamshievich Orunbayev (Kyrgyz: Кеңешбек Шамшиевич Орунбаев; born 14 July 1962), known as The Ivolginsky Ripper (Russian: Иволгинский потрошитель), is a Kyrgyzstani-Russian serial killer, rapist, necrophile and cannibal who murdered six women in Altai Krai and Buryatia between 1991 and 2012, sexually abusing their corpses afterwards. He was found guilty of these murders, and sentenced to life imprisonment, which he is serving at the Black Dolphin Prison.

== Biography ==
Little information is available about Orunbayev's early life. It is known that he was born in the Kirghiz SSR in 1962, and emigrated to Russia in the early 1990s. His first known murder took place in March 1991 in Novoaltaysk, Altai Krai, where he lived in a rented home with his 76-year-old landlord. One night, while having dinner with her, Orunbayev offered to have sex with her, but she refused. Out of anger, he beat her to death with the blunt end of an axe and raped her corpse. On the following day, he doused the house in kerosene and lit it on fire, destroying most of it. The victim's body was discovered after the fire was put out and it was established that she had been murdered, but the crime remained a cold case until November 2022, when Orunbayev confessed to being the killer.

Between this period and 1997, it is known that he committed two murders, for which he served several years in prison. While nothing is known about the first one, including the place and date, the second took place in 1997, in Nizhnyaya Ivolga, for which he served 8 years imprisonment. In 2006, he was released and returned to Buryatia. As he lacked any sort of income, he lived with spontaneous acquaintances in various settlements around the area, surviving by doing odd jobs.

After laying low for about a year, in July 2007, he met a young girl on the streets of Ulan-Ude. After casually getting to know each other, the pair caught a taxi to the village of Myasokombinat, where they sat down to drink alcohol on the bank of the Uda River. In his drunken state, he offered to have sex with the girl, but she refused his advances. Angered, Orunbayev strangled her to death and then had sex with the body, leaving it on the riverbank. The next day, he returned to the crime scene, dismembered the remains and then discarded them into the river. They were never located, and the victim's identity remains unknown.

In the next years, there are no other recorded murders or crimes which could be attributed to Kegashbek. He worked in the construction and repairs business, earning money mainly by private contracts. After completing one such job in July 2012, he rented a room at the Khutorok Hotel in Ulan-Ude, where he drank alcohol for several hours. On the evening of July 11, he went out in search for a casual hook-up, coming across a woman whom he invited back to his hotel room to drink. After a while, Orunbayev began to think that the woman had stolen his money. Enraged, he strangled her with a shoelace and hid the body under the bed, going to buy a knife from the nearby market with which he would dismember it. However, about halfway through the return journey, he changed his mind and fled instead. Later on, he found the "missing" money in his pockets. The woman's body was eventually found by the authorities, who began an investigation to catch her killer.

After the last murder, he left Ulan-Ude and settled in the Ivolginsky District, where he worked as a laborer. On September 20, he decided to visit a 53-year-old woman living in Nyzhnyaya Ivolga, whom he had previously done repairs for. After a short conversation, he offered to have sex with her, but was quickly shot down. Angered, Orunbayev began punching and kicking in the woman's head, beating her to death. After murdering the victim, Kegashbek dragged the body into a nearby abandoned building, where he had sex with her corpse, which he then disemboweled and partially dismembered. When he was finished with his cruel deed, he fed the victim's entrails to a neighbor's dog, leaving the village and returning to Ulan-Ude. By this time, the investigation team had collected enough evidence for an arrest, and sent out a team of officers, who promptly detained Orunbayev four days later on a bridge, when he was about to cross into the Tarbagataysky District.

During the investigation, Orunbayev's previous murder convictions were uncovered, and he himself later confessed to the two murders he committed after his release. He admitted that each and every of the murders were done while he was intoxicated, and after being refused sex. He additionally admitted that he had kept some of the victims' disemboweled guts, which he would then consume. He was ordered to take a psychiatric examination, from which the doctors determined that he was sane, but had pronounced psychopathic traits and suffered from sexual sadism disorder, which led to the gruesome nature of his killings. Due to the severity of his crimes, he was sentenced to life imprisonment, which he is serving at the Black Dolphin Prison in Orenburg.

In November 2022, Orunbayev confessed to his first known murder committed outside Buryatia and the oldest linked to him to date. After his confession was shown to match the cold case, he was convicted after a short trial and given another life sentence.

== See also ==
- List of Russian serial killers
