= Valery Skoptsov =

Russian criminal and serial killer

- Born: Valery Nikolaevich Skoptsov; 1 August 1951; Velikiye Luki, Pskov Oblast, RSFSR
- Died: April 12, 2004 (aged 52); Black Dolphin Prison, Sol-Iletsk, Orenburg Oblast, Russia
- Other name: "The Villain of All Trades"
- Conviction: Murder
- Penalty: Death; commuted to life imprisonment

Details
- Victims: 9
- Span of crimes: 1995–1996
- Country: Russia
- States: Oryol, Bryansk, Smolensk
- Date apprehended: 4 October 1996
- Imprisoned at: Black Dolphin Prison, Sol-Iletsk, Orenburg Oblast

Valery Nikolaevich Skoptsov (Russian: Вале́рий Никола́евич Скопцо́в; 1 August 1951 – 12 April 2004), known as The Villain of all Trades (Russian: Злодей на все руки), was a Russian criminal and serial killer, who was known for committing a variety of crimes around the USSR and then after Russia, ranging from thefts to murders.

== Biography ==
Skoptsov was born on 1 August 1951, in the town of Velikiye Luki, Pskov Oblast. He was a talented and gifted child, graduating from a music school in three years, while most of his peers did in seven. In addition, Valery graduated from high school with a gold medal, and at the same, while also attending an art school, he participated in numerous poetry competitions, often winning them. After school, he entered a medical university, with the aim of becoming a neurosurgeon. During his studies, Skoptsov was engaged in amateur performances, was a secretary for the CPSU and an excellent student. On the other hand, his stepbrother, Sergei Turaev, was the exact opposite: he did not want to study or work, and often stole and drank too much. At one point, the two brothers ransacked a neighbouring cottage, for which they were reprimanded, but weren't hindered at all by this. Soon after, they stole a car and were rearrested. Skoptsov took the blame, and after a mental examination by the Serbsky Institute, he was declared insane, with a diagnosis of schizophrenia. He soon left the medical university, as it was forbidden for somebody to study as a doctor if they were schizophrenic, and so, he enrolled on a cultural enlightenment school. After graduating ahead of schedule and with honours, he entered into the Leningrad Institute of Culture. Among his classmates were Valery Leontiev, Tõnis Mägi and a number of other future pop stars.

Soon, Skoptsov became interested in spiritual chants. To practice them, however, he required textbooks, which were banned under Soviet law. He stole some from the library's closed fund, only choosing the most valuable: the altar gospel and a number of books on hymns, ancient Russian paintings and icons. For this, he was sentenced to 7 years imprisonment. Skoptsov became heavily sought after in the criminal world, due to his impressive printmaking skills - the making of seals and stamps, and, by extension, falsification of documents. He began dabbling with this even while incarcerated but to no avail. After working hard as a printmaker, he peaked in quality: the documents created by him were visually impossible to distinguish from real ones.

Soon after their release, the two brothers went to work in the Byelorussian SSR, where they made fences for village cemeteries. On the night of February 24, 1989, in the town of Obol, Vitebsk Region, Skoptsov and Turaev broke into the state farm cash desk: they cracked open the safe with the help of a thermal lance, in which they found 168 Rbls 32 kop. Grabbing a typewriter, as well as stamps from the DOSAAF and the Society for the Protection of Antiquities, they fled. Sergei was arrested and testified; Valery disappeared from the view of law enforcement agencies for the next 7 years.

Skoptsov left for Leningrad, where he acquired a passport from a tramp and, placing his photograph on the passport, he was now known as "Yevgeny Borisovich Spiridonov". Subsequently, he changed his last, first and middle names, wives and residence permits a total of 13 more times. In Leningrad, Skoptsov graduated from the Beekeping Institute, while still maintaining part-time jobs as a graphic designer and printmaker. In October 1990, he carjacked a car from a garage cooperative in Veliky Novgorod and, after changing the license plates and forging the documents, sold it. He repeated this "operation" on multiple other occasions. His places of residence, along with the areas he committed crimes, constantly changed, moving mainly between the Northwestern and Central parts of Russia. Namely, he had stayed in St. Petersburg and Veliky Novgorod, as well as the Ryazan, Tula, Kaluga, Bryansk, Oryol and Smolensk oblasts.

At the end of 1993, Skoptsov was driving a stolen car through the Smolensk Oblast, when he was stopped by traffic police. He offered them a bribe, and he was not arrested for hijacking: he handed the officers expensive products that were in the car, as well as the car itself. By the time the authorities discovered a warehouse worth of fake documents and a unique musical instrument/firearm hybrid made from an ordinary squeezebox, Valery was very far ahead of them. His fascinating creation was later put on display at the Museum of the Ministry of Internal Affairs.

The severity of Skoptsov's crimes gradually began to escalate. In February 1995, he raped an 11-year-old girl in the village of Zhuchki, in Smolensk Oblast, who barely escaped with her life. After that, Valery moved to the Oryol Oblast, and at the Lesnaya Polyana recreation centre, he got himself acquainted with Mikhail Karpukhin, an alcoholic watchman who also had a part-time job as an entertainer. Skoptsov then bought a house, which was next door to the headquarters of the Uritsky District police.

On the night of 3 August 1995, Skoptsov and Karpukhin committed a double murder along the 24th kilometre of the Oryol-Bryansk highway, taking with them a VAZ-2105 Zhigula and dumping the corpses in a nearby pond afterwards. Using his forgery skills, Valery later sold the car in Tula Oblast. Karpukhin, taking advantage of his position as an official, kept his partner-in-crime in the know about the police investigation. According to Skoptsov, "the local police chiefs were steaming in the bathhouse, getting drunk and talking about who's what".

In the summer of 1995, Skoptsov acquired the "Bright Life" plot, near the lake of the "Zvezda" horticultural partnership. There, he also set up his car, which functioned as his workshop: in it, he had many machines, pesticides, artisanal devices for making seals, and much more. Soon, Skoptsov made friends with a group of scammers led by Vladimir "San Sanych" Manuilov, who constantly was in need of fake documents. However, after some time, he stopped paying Valery, and the latter stopped making fake documents in response. Then Manuilov and his assistant Pogasyan, nicknamed "Ara", beat up Skoptsov, breaking his arm in the process, before tying him to a wheelchair and dousing him with gasoline. At the last moment, they provided some first aid to Valery, telling him that he would now work free of charge and that his trailer would be converted into a warehouse.

Wanting to exact revenge, Skoptsov lured Manuilov, Pogasyan and their associate Irina Streltsova into the trailer, where he shot them all with a converted sawed-off shotgun, which fired live flare gun ammunition, before he set off to Bryansk, where he believed that Manuilov's wife had a significant amount in dollars. On June 20, 1996, after having a bottle of vodka with Svetlana Manuilova and her friend, Lyudmila Sinichenko, he killed both but found no money. After this, Skoptsov began feeling very ill, barely reaching the swamps on the outskirts of Bryansk before losing consciousness: likely a result of poor-quality vodka. There, he was discovered by Sergei Sharipov and his friend, who were long-time drug addicts. With Sharipov's help, Valery returned to the Manuilov residence, where he first burned the bodies before burying them. As an act of gratitude, he gave Sergei a gold ring and watch, lifted off Streltsova's corpse. Subsequently, the duo committed another double murder, reminiscent of the one done with Karpukhin, one of the victims being a police officer. Sharipov was soon after detained in Bryansk and implicated his companion; however, he knew him under the name of "Vitaly Pilipenko". Despite this, while browsing through the files of the MOI, Skoptsov was recognized by the officers via a snapshot, as a wanted criminal who has been on the run for 7 years.

Meanwhile, Skoptsov now lived in the village of Zalegoshch, with a forged passport under the name of "Oleg Porfiriyev", a forged teaching diploma and employment record book. He got a job as a singing and drawing teacher at a local school, gaining high authority among staff and students alike. Soon, however, some of his students saw his mugshot on television with the caption "Attention, wanted!". They reported this news to their teacher, but this time, he didn't run away. He was soon arrested by the police while teaching one of his classes.

== Investigation, trial and death ==
Skoptsov willingly confessed to the investigators, providing a full testimony with colourful illustrations, including the 9 murders. On 9 July 1998, the Oryal Oblast Court sentenced him to death, but it was later commuted to life imprisonment. Mikhail Karpukhin got 8 years at a corrective labour colony, while Sergei Sharipov died of tuberculosis at the Oryol detention centre.

He was sent to serve his sentence at the Black Dolphin Prison, where his main occupation was poetry:

"I now have no fate,

There is even no earth, no sky,

Like God's free slaves,

We get here a ration of bread".

According to investigators, Skoptsov did not regret his actions. During one of the interrogations, he was quoted as saying: "It was necessary to clean up after my brother and Sharipov, too. My brother broke my fate."

On 12 April 2004, Valery Skoptsov died from acute heart failure, at the age of 52. He was buried in the prison cemetery.

== In popular culture ==
- Documentary film "Villain of all Trades" from the series "Criminal Russia"
- Documentary film "Dark Genius" from the series "The investigation was conducted..."

== See also ==
- List of Russian serial killers
