= Yuri Tsiuman =

Soviet serial killer (born 1969)

- Born: Yuri Leonidovich Tsiuman; 30 January 1969 (age 57); Taganrog, Rostov Oblast, RSFSR
- Other names: The Black Tights Killer; The Night Guest
- Convictions: Murder, rape
- Penalty: Death penalty; commuted to life imprisonment

Details
- Victims: 4–5
- Span of crimes: 1986/1990–1991
- Country: Soviet Union
- State: Rostov
- Date apprehended: 26 November 1992
- Imprisoned at: Black Dolphin Prison

Yuri Leonidovich Tsiuman (born 30 January 1969), known as The Black Tights Killer ("Черноколготочник", transliteration "Chernokolgotochnik"), and The Night Guest, is a Soviet serial killer. All of his victims are reported to have worn black pantyhose. This article of clothing became known as the killer's "calling card".

== Biography ==
Tsiuman was born on 30 January 1969, in the city of Taganrog, Russia. He had a difficult childhood: his parents were chronic alcoholics who constantly beat him and even threatened to kill him, something for which his father was repeatedly tried. When his father became seriously ill and died in one of the family's rooms, instead of going to the police his mother began instead to bring in lovers and have sex with them, all in front of her son.

During his childhood, Tsiuman was practically speechless with his peers and was considered a quiet and calm character. He always sat on the bench at the entrance of his grandmother's house and was instructed to roll children in wheelchairs around the yard.

As an adult, he was considered an intelligent person and had a passion for thriller films (for watching new films, he used cable TV), was an alcoholic, and had significant issues in talking with women, an illness called hypoactive sexual desire disorder.

Tsiuman's first murder was committed in 1986 on 24–25 December. He had attacked a 16-year-old school girl named Maria during the night and had taken her hostage. At first, she resisted, but later gave in and suggested that Tsiuman go to her apartment, all in the hope that there was somebody there to save her. Unfortunately, there was nobody home. In the apartment, Tsiuman tied her up, beat, raped and strangled her (or rather, tried to strangle her). Before leaving the apartment, he robbed and set fire to the girl's property and room. Further information about the fate of Tsiuman's first victim differs between sources: in one source it is said that the arson failed and the girl survived; in the other, that she died.

From 1987 to 1989 there were no murders due to Tsiuman's enlistment in the Russian army and serving on the missile forces team.

In late June 1989, he committed a new attack on another girl and attempted to beat and rape her, again late at night. After having accosted her and forcibly violating her unsuccessfully, he took her to his apartment. He then forced her to perform oral and penetrative sexual intercourse, but he was unable to continue. He then got dressed and took her out onto the street, but she managed to escape from Tsiuman by alerting a couple who happened to walk by them. This crime is said to have been ignored by police but was blackmailed by the victim's friends. This resulted in Tsiuman leaving for Stavropol quickly after.

Between 1990 and 1991, he raped and killed four girls [others report five] in Taganrog (from 12 to 13 May, 26 to 27 May, 14th to 15th September, 1990 and on 2 June 1991). As victims, he specifically chose girls who wore black stockings, these becoming his signature or calling card, as all of his victims would be wearing these garments when examined posthumously.

Yuri Tsiuman was not very cautious with his actions. On 26 November 1992, the killer was detained by two random strangers named Mikurov and Chizhevsky when attempting to commit another murder. By this time, however, the investigation had gathered mounting evidence against Tsiuman, including a blood group, hair samples, belongings, photographs, along with matching fingerprints and other forensic evidence.

On 11 February 1994, Tsiuman pleaded guilty and was sentenced to death for all four murders, but since a moratorium was imposed on the death penalty at that time, it was replaced with life imprisonment. The verdict was displayed all across Russia, the trial was televised, as well as a post-trial interview with Tsiuman where he described more fully his crimes and motives. He is currently serving his sentence in the Black Dolphin Prison in Sol-Iletsk, located in the Orenburg Oblast, where he is scheduled to be released very soon. He is reported to be interested in poetry writing and shows a desire to visit his mother.

In 2011, he unsuccessfully tried to challenge the replacement of the death penalty with life imprisonment in the Supreme Court of Russia, considering imprisonment as a deterioration of his position.

== In the media ==
- Episode "A look inside" from the series "Russian psychiatrist" (1996).
- Episode "The Triangle of Death" from the series "Unexplained, but fact" (2005).
- Episode "Dashing 90's" from the series "Chikatilo's Successors" (2007).
- "Hunting for maniacs" - Channel First (2008).
- Episode "Black Tights Killers" from the series "The investigation led by…" (2011).
- "Your bitch" - song by performer ZAMAI (2016).

== See also ==
- List of Russian serial killers
- Criminal Code of Russia
- Serial Killer
- Russian mafia
- Childhood trauma
- Child abuse
- Psychotic depression
- Sexual desire disorder
- Psychological reactance
