= Vadim Ershov =

Russian serial killer

- Born: Vadim Nikolayevich Ershov; 15 February 1973 (age 53); Rechnoy, Kirov Oblast, RSFSR
- Other names: The Krasnoyrask Beast; The Krasnoyarsk Chikatilo; The Maniac with a Diary
- Conviction: Murder
- Penalty: Death; commuted to life imprisonment

Details
- Victims: 19
- Span of crimes: 1992–1995
- Country: Russia
- State: Krasnoyarsk
- Date apprehended: 29 October 1995

Vadim Nikolayevich Ershov (Russian: Вади́м Никола́евич Ершо́в; born 15 February 1973), known as The Krasnoyarsk Beast (Russian: Красноярский зверь), is a Russian serial killer. Between 1992 and 1995, he committed more than 70 crimes in Krasnoyarsk and its environs, including 19 murders and 8 attempted murders. He is considered one of the most terrible serial killers in the history of the Krasnoyarsk Krai.

== Biography ==
Little is known about Ershov's early life. In May 1991, he was drafted into the Soviet Army, and served in the Far East. During his service, he was subjected to bullying by other soldiers. Once he attacked one of the abusers, beat him with a brick and hit him several times with a knife, then deserted and returned to Krasnoyarsk.

Soon Ershov raped a 16-year-old vocational school student on the banks of the Yenisei River, but left her alive. Then, on 28 November 1992, he raped and hammered a 42-year-old foodservice employee with a stick. Over the next three years, he committed another 18 rapes of women, 15 of which resulted in murder. The victims of the killer were both young girls and elderly women. One of the investigators recalled: "I got the impression that he was killing to hide traces of his crimes; in one case – rape, in another – robbery. How to erase traces... The beast. He is the beast – purely animal instincts."

In parallel, Ershov committed about 40 robberies, some of which resulted in the killing of victims. One of them was a policeman who tried to detain him. While trying to capture the criminal, the main forces of the Krasnoyarsk police were abandoned. However, he was detained by accident. On 29 October 1995, the killer attacked a 16-year-old girl and tried to take off her gold chain. Her cries were heard by relatives, and Ershov tried to hide. Of the two men he met, he managed to fight off one with a knife, but one of the local women knocked him out with a fire extinguisher. A police squad arrived and took Ershov to the Railroad Police Department of Krasnoyarsk.

The nuances of Ershov's detention vary according to information from various sources. According to the newspaper Moskovskij Komsomolets, he was struck with a fire extinguisher, while according to Irina Petrakovoy, a journalist from Gazeta.Ru, Ershov was arrested by a policeman he had wounded with a knife. From the newspaper Trud, it is implied that Ershov attacked a woman at the entrance of her house whose husband was an officer of the Federal Security Service, who chased after and captured Ershov.

According to information from journalist and writer Nikolai Modestov: "...at the time of Ershov's arrest, in accordance to the three murders, innocent people were already convicted."

=== Trial and sentence ===
Initially, Ershov refused to give evidence, called himself by a false name and claimed to be a tramp. Later, while confessing to law enforcement officials, he pointed to his real residence, where irrefutable evidence was found – the tools of the crime (two knives that he called "feathers"), as well as the belongings of the victims (an old jacket and a worn coat) and their passports. An important clue against Ershov was his diary of seven columns, in which he wrote down all his attacks in detail: the first column – the number of the victim, the second – the time of year, the third – the instrument of the crime (capital "P" – committed with a knife; capital "N" – committed with a table knife; "p" – crime committed by hands or with a stick), the fourth – the nature of the injury ("p" – wound, "t" – corpse), the fifth – sex of the victim, the sixth – the crime scene and year of the crime. According to Ershov, the outcome of all his attacks was surely checked through the media (reading newspapers and watching television), and also returned to the scenes of the crime committed by him and watched the operators work from a safe distance.

In June 1998, the Siberian Military District Court found him guilty on all counts and sentenced him to death by firing squad. According to the expert opinion of the Serbsky Center, Ershov "suffered from a total delay in psychosexual development... with an anomaly of the sexual attraction of the sadistic circle in the form of a desire to rape and the desire to kill"; but the court recognized him as sane. During the reading of a multi-judge verdict (the criminal case was 43 volumes) Ershov, usually calm, lost consciousness. His lawyer filed a cassation appeal, seeking to mitigate the sentence of his client, but Ershov himself stated that he "lost the right to live." On 28 January 1999, the Military Collegium of the Supreme Court upheld the verdict without changes.

Due to the moratorium on the death penalty announced in the country, the punishment for Vadim Ershov was changed to life imprisonment. He is currently serving his sentence in the Black Dolphin Prison in Sol-Iletsk, Orenburg Oblast.

== See also ==
- List of Russian serial killers
- List of serial killers by number of victims

== Literature ==
- Nikolay Modestov: Manicas...Blind Death: The Chronicle of Serial Killings - M: Nadezhda-I, 1997 - 284 p. (Criminal secrets) - ISBN 5-86150-041-X.
- L. Rak: Beast. The Krasnoyarsk Maniac was sentenced to be shot. Trud - M. 1998, 7 August
