= Hafiz Razzakov =

Uzbekistani-born Russian terrorist and serial killer

- Born: Hafiz Hamzayevich Razzakov; 5 September 1975 (age 51); Ziyovuddin, Samarkand Region, Uzbek SSR
- Other names: "The Borovets Maniac" "Abdul-Akhat" "Hasan" "Damir"
- Conviction: Murder x9
- Penalty: Life imprisonment

Details
- Victims: 9
- Span of crimes: June – October 2004
- Country: Russia
- State: Tatarstan
- Date apprehended: 8 November 2004
- Imprisoned at: Black Dolphin Prison, Sol-Iletsk, Orenburg Oblast

Hafiz Hamzayevich Razzakov (Russian: Хафиз Хамзаевич Раззаков; born 5 September 1975), known as The Borovets Maniac (Russian: Боровецкий маньяк), is an Uzbekistani-born Russian terrorist and serial killer who murdered nine people in the city of Naberezhnye Chelny from June to October 2004. Razzakov, a member of an extremist Islamist organization named Islamic Djamaat (Russian: Исламский джамаат), targeted victims he considered to be infidels.

Razzakov would later be arrested for the murders, tried and successfully convicted, receiving a life sentence.

== Early life ==
Little is known about Razzakov's early life. Born on 5 September 1975 in Ziyovuddin, Samarkand Region in the Uzbek SSR, he had two brothers and grew up in a stable household. In the early 1990s, following the dissolution of the USSR, Razzakov's family moved to Bryansk. Having obtained Russian citizenship, he was drafted into the Russian Armed Forces in 1993, and after serving two years, he returned to Bryansk and got a job at the patrol and checkpoint service.

In 1997, Hafiz, together with his older brother Haidar, moved to the city of Naberezhnye Chelny in Tatarstan, where he worked as a security guard for the Electrotechnical Department of Internal Affairs and later at the patrol and checkpoint service, but he quit after several months of internship.

=== Radicalization ===
Presumably in early 1997, in a mosque on Elevator Hill in Naberezhnye Chelny, Razzakov met terrorist recruiters Alexei "Abu-Bakr" Ilyin and Sherali "Abu-Kodyro" Shukurov, who told him of the "Kavkaz" training center in the village of Serzhen-Yurt in Chechnya, operated by Shamil Basayev and Ibn al-Khattab, where they taught Muslims Sharia law. According to investigators, Razzakov went to Serzhen-Yurt in March 1997, where he was recruited by Chechen militants and took on the name "Abdul-Akhat" and later "Hasan".

In the following months, Razzakov, now a member of a group called Islamic Djamaat, underwent military training, studying subjects such as combat tactics, explosives and mines, the practice of hostage-taking to pressure political opponents inside the country, and gained theoretical and practical skills in subversion and terrorist training; he also learned the teachings of Wahhabism.

However, Razzakov's brother Haidar denied these claims, saying that the "Kavkaz" training center was a simple religious institution and that Hafiz had gone there to study Islamic law because there were no other such places in Russia except in Chechnya. However, Hafiz allegedly went missing after being supposedly being wounded in combat, despite the First Chechen War having ended and the Second not having begun yet. As a result, Haidar claimed that he went searching for him.

=== Terrorist activities ===
In March 1999, Razzakov and three other men (Maxim Gaponov and brothers Ilkhom and Sherali Shukurov) from the "Kavkaz" training center received an assignment from al-Khattab to seize a hostage in Naberezhnye Chelny for ransom, as they needed money to fund their activities against the federal authorities. Al-Khattab allocated money for the operation, with which Razzakov and his accomplices purchased a Lada Riva and a Kamaz truck, installing a wooden box in the latter vehicle to keep the victim.

On 1 July 1999, the men abducted Anatoly Geller, the son of the head of the housing department of Naberezhnye Chelny, and took him to Mordovia. For two weeks, Geller was subjected to all kinds of abuse and systematic beatings, after which he was secretly transported to the town of Urus-Martan. The father of the kidnapped man, Yakov, eventually paid the ransom of $320,000, after which a hostage exchange was conducted on 7 September near the KAVKAZ-1 police checkpoint on the border between Chechnya and Ingushetia. According to Razzakov, he received a financial reward of $10,000 from al-Khattab for the kidnapping.

In the fall of 1999, Razzakov returned to Chechnya, where he took part in the Battle of Grozny and later another battle in the nearby village of Vedeno. After the end of the large-scale hostilities in Chechnya in April 2000, he went into hiding for about a year before returning to Naberezhnye Chelny in March 2001. There, he continued serving in the Islamic Djamaat under the leadership of Ilgam "Akhmad" Gumerov. Together with eight other militants, Razzakov terrorized those he considered to be "infidels", most of which were moderate Tatars and imams.

Under Gumerov's leadership, the Islamic Djamaat was active in several areas, including Naberezhnye Chelny; the Tukayevsky and Aznakayevsky Districts of Tatarstan; and the Beloretsky and Uchalinsky Districts of Bashkortostan. During this period, they recruited 42-year-old Nafis Kalimullin, deputy director of the "Rynok" LLC and local criminal who supplied finances and manpower to the group. According to the contemporary Interior Minister, Rashid Nurgaliyev, the group had approximately 41 members at this time.

In early 2003, the group was visited by 45-year-old Shamil Tamimdarov, a contact of Chechen field commander Ruslan Gelayev, who instructed Gumerov to set up a military field camp in the forests of Bashkortostan, collect donations from the parishioners of the Tauba Mosque in Naberezhnye Chelny and attack government supply vehicles. The military camp was established at the foot of the "Teschin Yaezik" mountain near Inzer.

=== Foiled robbery and lone wolf activity ===
Soon after the establishment of the camp, Razzakov robbed the office of the "Krasny Vostok" firm in Naberezhnye Chelny, after which he began preparations to rob a collection vehicle carrying cash to one of the city's banks. For several days, he monitored the work schedule of the firm, as well as the route and time the vehicle appeared, but was eventually noticed by security guards. Due to this, the collectors stopped appearing, and Razzakov was forced to abandon the plan.

In the summer of 2004, Gumerov announced the preparation of several terrorist attacks at once – these included the organization of an explosions at a Kamaz automobile plant; at a water intake in Naberezhnye Chelny; at the Nizhnekamskneftekhim in Nizhnekamsk; at the Kazan Helicopter Plant; at a railway station in Agryz; at the military unit of the Ministry of Emergency Situations in Naberezhnye Chelny and finally, a planned mass murder event during the celebration of 1000th anniversary of the city of Kazan. However, Razzakov was dissatisfied with the slow pace of the preparations for the attacks, after which he decided to start committing murders on his own.

== Murders ==
In the summer of 2004, a series of murders occurred in the Borovets forest in Naberezhnye Chelny, near the embankment of the Shilna River. Razzakov chose his victims to be young couples, with his modus operandi being to approach the car and shoot the occupants, without subjecting the female victims to any sexual violence.

On 7 June 2004, Razzakov committed his first murders. At about 10 PM, he approached an Oka occupied by Sergei Shakirov, a businessman from Mendeleyevsk, and two prostitutes named Natalia Belykh and Olga Yurchenko. Razzakov opened the door to the passenger seat and stabbed Belykh several times in the chest, after which he attacked Shakirov. During the attack, he stabbed Shakirov several times, but was fought off, allowing the victim to push him out of the car. Razzakov then pulled out a pistol at Shakirov at least six times through the window, killing him on the spot. After examining the interior of the car, he found that he had accidentally struck Yurchenko with a stray bullet which had hit her heart. In order to get rid of any evidence, Razzakov set the car on fire.

On 30 June, Razzakov met 17-year-old tourist Mikhail Osipov in the forest, who had fallen behind his tour group and gotten lost. After speaking with him for a bit, Razzakov shot Osipov and stole a map from his body. When questioned about this murder in particular later on, Razzakov was unable to explain why he killed Osipov, with news outlets speculating that it was either because he wanted to steal his map or because he was afraid that the young man would report him to the authorities for being suspicious.

On 20 August, Razzakov fatally shot two employees of the Elekam store, 31-year-old Ivan Sidorov and 27-year-old Gulnara Gareeva. He then stole 12,765 rubles, a cellphone and Gareeva's jewelry. Their bodies were later found by mushroom pickers.

A week later, on 27 August, Razzakov came across 45-year-old Zalif Gainetdinov and 41-year-old Elza Gilyazova, who were on a date near a bridge overlooking the Shilna River. He then pulled out a gun and shot them both, stealing 4,500 rubles, their watches and Gilyazova's jewelry.

On 27 October, Razzakov committed his final murder – killing his mistress, Svetlana Sharipova. This killing differed significantly from the rest, as Razzakov claimed that on the day of the murders, he had confessed his crimes to her while they were in the kitchen and tried to convince her that it was justified because they were non-believers. However, Sharipova ostracized him and demanded that he leave and never return – angered by her refusal to adhere to his beliefs, he then pulled out his gun and shot in the head.

== Arrest ==
The murders caused a panic across Tatarstan, leading to a special investigation unit being formed and led under the direct control of Mintimer Shaimiev, the contemporary President of the Republic. Yevgeny Vdovin, the head of the Federal Security Service in Tatarstan, was dispatched to Naberezhnye Chelny to assist investigators, and warnings were issued for local residents not go into the forest.

Between the summer and fall of 2004, the Borovets Forest was heavily patrolled by police, whose officers blocked all entrances to the forest park, dug up dirt roads with ditches, and made rubble from fallen trees. Female investigators even disguised themselves as civilians in an attempt to catch the killer, but all attempts were unsuccessful.

After the murder of Svetlana Sharipova, Razzakov was considered the primary suspect, as his neighbor's testimony led them to believe he was responsible. This was due to the fact that Razzakov – who introduced himself as "Damir" – had a fondness for a certain type of green tea, which was found in a teapot in the apartment on the day of Sharipova's murder. After studying the details of phone calls made from the victim's phone, investigators located Razzakov and arrested him on 8 November 2004.

=== Confessions ===
In the initial interrogations, Razzakov fully admitted his guilt and confessed to all of the murders, justifying it by saying that they were "infidels". He also told them of his participation in the Islamic Djamaat, with a search of his apartment uncovering camouflaged clothing, homemade belts with the words shahid written on them, blueprints for explosive devices and two pistols. A ballistic examination concluded that one of the pistols was the murder weapon, while the other belonged to Kalimullin, who was also arrested. He later denied participating in the murders, claiming that he had given the gun to Razzakov to repair a faulty trigger mechanism.

Following his arrest, Razzakov also claimed involvement in two terrorist incidents: the summer 1999 attack on a roadblock near the village of Muni in Dagestan, where ten police officers were killed, and also the 2000 Zhani-Vedeno ambush. He claimed he and his accomplices took 11 servicemen as prisoners and later executed them all in a violent manner, with his group taking the most "active" part in the execution process.

Razzakov's arrest led to the downfall of the Islamic Djamaat, as based on his and the testimony of Kalimullin, security forces uncovered their camp in Bashkortostan and arrested several members, including Haidar Razzakov. A search of the camp led to the seizure of several AK-47s; 8 pistols with silencers; grenades; sawn-off shotguns; hunting rifles; more than 500 grams of explosives and improvised explosive devices. The head of the group, Ilgan Gumerov, was put on a wanted list, but fled into neighboring Kazakhstan, where he was found and arrested on 14 April 2005. The last members to remain at large, Danil Gabdulkhakov and his cousin Vener Khazetdinov and their families, were detained in Orenburg Oblast on the night of 22 September 2007, while attempting to cross the border into Kazakhstan.

=== Trial and sentence ===
In November 2006, the investigation was completed and the 127-volume criminal case was sent to jury trial, which began in February 2007. At the request of his lawyers, Razzakov was transferred to the Serbsky Center to undergo a forensic medical examination for two months. He was diagnosed as completely sane and able to stand trial.

On 14 February 2008, the Supreme Court of the Republic of Tatarstan found Razzakov guilty on all counts and sentenced him to life imprisonment. Shortly before the verdict, he recanted his confessions and proclaimed that he was solely guilty of killing Sharipova, but this claim was disregarded.

== Imprisonment and current status ==
Following his conviction, Razzakov was transferred to serve his sentence at the Black Dolphin Prison.

In early 2022, investigators interviewed Razzakov in relation to the 2000 Zhani-Vedeno ambush, with his testimony leading to the arrest of multiple militants, including his brother, Haidar. In July of that year, Hafiz was charged with terrorism and attempted murder-related offenses and transferred to stand trial in Naberezhnye Chelny.

On 14 April 2023, he was found guilty on all counts and sentenced to another life term, after which he was returned to the Black Dolphin Prison.

== See also ==
- List of Russian serial killers
