= Razzakov (disambiguation) =

Razzakov is a town in Kyrgyzstan.

Razzakov may also refer to:

- Razzakov Airport, Kyrgyzstan
- Hafiz Razzakov, Russian Islamic terrorist and serial killer
- Iskhak Razzakov, Kyrgyz politician
