= Alexander Pirovskih =

Russian serial killer and fraudster

- Born: Alexander Gennadyevich Pirvoskih; 10 July 1958 (age 68); Chelyabinsk, Chelyabinsk Oblast, RSFSR
- Convictions: Murder; Fraud
- Penalty: Life imprisonment

Details
- Victims: 5
- Span of crimes: 1997–1999
- Country: Russia
- State: Chelyabinsk
- Date apprehended: 25 July 2001
- Imprisoned at: Black Dolphin Prison, Sol-Iletsk, Orenburg Oblast

Alexander Gennadyevich Pirovskih (Russian: Александр Геннадьевич Пировских; born 10 July 1958) is a Russian fraudster and serial killer who killed five people in his native city of Chelyabinsk from 1997 to 1999.

== Biography ==
Pirovskih was born on 10 July 1958, in Chelyabinsk to industrial workers Gennady Alexandrovich and Olga Anatolyevna Pirovskih. Upon completing his schooling he served in the army. After his service, he graduated from a vocational school and got a job at the Chelyabinsk Automatical-Mechanical Plant (AMZ). After the socio-economic upheavals of the country in the late 1980s to early 1990s, he quit his job and started a business travelling to Novosibirsk to buy goods and sell them in Chelyabinsk markets at an inflated price. Pirovskih had a pathological greed for money, and according to the statements of friends, he was an unpleasant person.

Pirovskih committed his first crime in 1997 when the concept of fraud came to him during a traffic collision. The owner of the car that had hit Pirovskih's paid him off for not reporting it to the traffic police. As a result, he decided to engage in the so-called "auto-stoppers" method, arranging car accidents in order to obtain compensation. The first experiment was successful, and then Pirovskih actively engaged in the activity. In the same year, in the village of Novotroitsky, Sosnovsky District, on Traktovaya Street, he bought a house which he decorated for his father and then insured, forging the deed himself and then insuring it a second time with another company. He then set fire to the house and received a large amount of money from each company.

In 1997 he bought a broken Volga with clean documents on the cheap, and decided to hijack the same car, removing the numbers and using it as a personal vehicle. One summer day, he got into a passing car and shot the driver Margaryan with an improvised gun, driving the body out of town. There he cut off the body's head and hands, burying them in a sand quarry, and then dumped the body in a reservoir. Thus, Pirovskih took control of the Volga but decided to sell it after some time. He still did not quit the shuttle trading business, because he believed that the status of a merchant added more respect in the eyes of others. During one of his trips to Novosibirsk, he met Elena Gerasimova, a mother of two children, who also traded in the market. He introduced himself to her as a hero from the war in Afghanistan and a participant in the "Cotton Case" in the group of Telman Gdlyan and Nikolai Ivanov. After some time, they were formally married. Pirovskih decided to lay hold of all the apartments of his new wife's relatives. Also, his wife's cousin Andrei Bannikov, who was registered in the apartment of Elena's mother, soon returned from prison to Chelyabinsk, but Pirovskih was not going to give up his plans. He was going to sell the apartments under the pretext of moving to the Krasnodar Krai, into one big house, and would then kill everyone. However, Gerasimova's relatives refused to move.

In February 1999, at the suggestion of Pirovskih, Gerasimova invited Andrei Bannikov to visit her. After a joint gathering, Bannikov, in a state of extreme intoxication, volunteered to join Pirovskih at his work. At DK Metallurgov, Alexander tore off the board from a bench and struck several crushing blows on Bannikov's head, killing him on the spot. After returning home, he confessed everything to his wife and persuaded her not to hand him over to his friends, members of local criminal groups.

Not wanting to further address the issue with the apartments, Pirovskih decided to sell only his wife's apartment, who supported her husband's idea of moving to the Krasnodar Krai. After the sale of the apartment, Gerasimova and her sons from the first marriage, Aleksey and Egor, loaded the things onto a rented truck and drove to the village of Tukbayevo, Sosnovsky District. There, on October 30, 1999, Pirovskih killed all three of them in cold blood and threw the bodies into an abandoned mine shaft. The triple murder netted Pirovskih $4,279 dollars.

== Arrest and trial ==
Pirovskih was soon identified by law enforcement authorities as the murderer, but there was no evidence against him. Sometime later, he was arrested and readily confessed, showing the burial place of Gerasimova and her children's bodies, as well as confessing to the two other murders and numerous instances of fraud. In January 2003, the Chelyabinsk Regional Court sentenced Alexander Pirovskih to life imprisonment in a special regime penal colony. The Supreme Court of Russia upheld the verdict. Currently, Pirovskih is serving his sentence in the Black Dolphin Prison, in Orenburg Oblast.

== See also ==
- List of Russian serial killers
