= Ramses Gaichayev =

Russian serial killer

- Born: Ramses Lobazanovich Gaichayev; 1976 (age 49–50); Shelkovskaya, Chechen-Ingush ASSR, RSFSR
- Other name: Ramses Goichayev
- Convictions: Murder x10 Rape; Robbery; Brigandage
- Penalty: Death; commuted to life imprisonment

Details
- Victims: 10+
- Span of crimes: 1997–1999
- Country: Russia
- States: Chechnya, Stavropol
- Date apprehended: December 1999
- Imprisoned at: Black Dolphin Prison, Sol-Iletsk, Orenburg Oblast

Ramses Lobazanovich Gaichayev (Russian: Рамзес Лобазанович Гайчаев; born 1976, Shelkovskaya, Chechen-Ingush ASSR, RSFSR) is a Russian serial killer, mass murderer, rapist, robber and brigand of ethnic Chechen descent. With the help of four accomplices, he robbed, raped and killed at least 10 people in Chervlennaya and Pyatigorsk from 1997 to 1999. Due to the severity of the crimes and the fact that all the victims were ethnic Russians, prosecutors petitioned to try Gaichayev and his main accomplice on charges of genocide — the first such recorded proposition in the country's modern history.

The genocide charges were eventually dropped, and Gaichayev was convicted on all counts and sentenced to death. The sentence was then automatically commuted to life imprisonment due to the moratorium on capital punishment in the country, and he remains behind bars.

== Background and murders ==
Little is publicly available about Gaichayev's life prior to his crimes, other than the fact he was born in 1976 in Shelkovskaya to an ethnic Chechen family. Sometime in early 1997, he partnered up with fellow villagers Rustam Khalidov, brothers Rizvan and Kharat Magomadovs, and Dzhabrail Espirov to organize a gang that would rob targets in the nearby village of Chervlennaya. As a rule, they would predominantly target people of ethnic Russian descent — it is unclear whether this was done because each of the gang members held racist views against them, or simply because they feared reprisals from the victims' families if they were to target Chechens.

From November 1997 to April 1999, Gaichayev with his accomplices robbed, raped and murdered at least 10 people in Chervlennaya and in the city of Pyatigorsk, in nearby Stavropol Krai. The killings quickly spread panic among the Russian population, as the murderers were extremely cruel and had no qualms about killing children or the elderly. Their modus operandi typically included breaking into the house and subduing the inhabitants, whereupon Gaichayev and Khalidov would rape the female victims before proceeding to kill all of the family members in a variety of ways. In one instance, killers broke into the house of Zemlyakov family, and after they had raped the wife, Gaichayev — the only person from the gang conclusively proven to have directly participated in the murders — grabbed an axe and hacked her to death. He then strangled the husband and tortured their 10-year-old son until he succumbed to his injuries. The only exception was the final murders, when the gang broke into the home of Mr. Yakimochkin, the director and a teacher at a local boarding school, whom Gaichayev gunned down with a machine gun along with his wife. After killing them, the gang members stole money and alcohol before fleeing the crime scene.

Gaichayev was initially arrested by Chechen militants in 1998, after a Sharia court ordered that he be detained for the murder of an elderly woman. However, when federal security officers approached the village, he was released and quickly resumed his killings. Eventually, Gaichayev and Khalidov were arrested again by federal authorities in December 1999 in the village of Tolstoy-Yurt, on the outskirts of Grozny. Rizvan Magomadov was detained in April 2001 during a sting operation in Yekaterinburg, Sverdlovsk Oblast, where he was the ringleader of a heroin smuggling ring along with several Tajikistani nationals. Media reports never clarified what happened to Kharat Magomadov or Dzhabrail Espirov, who are presumably still at large.

== Trial and imprisonment ==
In the end, only Gaichayev and Khalidov were put on trial for the murders. The crimes were considered so severe that prosecutor Maria Semisynova suggested that genocide charges should be included in the indictments, arguing that the targeted killing of Russians was a clear example of ethnic cleansing. The courts disagreed with her assessment, as there were no indications that Gaichayev or his accomplices were militants and were rather motivated by robbery — when the charge itself was raised in court, Gaichayev blurted out that he «had done nothing wrong, but simply killed Russians». If charged, he would have become the first person to be tried on genocide charges in the history of the modern Russian state.

On April 18, 2001, both men were found guilty — Gaichayev on all counts, while Khalidov was only found guilty of rape and robbery. Later that day, Gaichayev was given the death sentence (later automatically commuted to life imprisonment) while Khalidov received 7 years imprisonment, and both were legally obliged to pay fines to the victims' families. Both of them refused to speak at trial or to the media after the verdicts were announced.

As of November 2022, Gaichayev remains behind bars and is currently imprisoned at the Black Dolphin Prison in Sol-Iletsk, Orenburg Oblast. No information is available about the fate of Khalidov and the other gang members.

== See also ==
- List of Russian serial killers
