= Stanislav Beloruscev =

Russian serial killer (born 1967)

- Born: 16 February 1967 (age 59); Krasnokamsk, Perm Krai, RSFSR
- Conviction: Murder (x11)
- Penalty: Life imprisonment (x4) plus 51 years

Details
- Victims: 12+
- Span of crimes: 2001–2009
- Country: Russia
- State: Perm
- Date apprehended: 2009
- Imprisoned at: Black Dolphin Prison, Sol-Iletsk, Orenburg Oblast

Stanislav Nikolayevich Beloruscev (Russian: Станислав Николаевич Белорусцев; born 16 February 1967) is a Russian serial killer who committed at least 12 murders in Krasnokamsk, Perm Krai, from 2001 to 2009. Initially convicted of a triple murder and sentenced to life imprisonment, he has since confessed to nine other murders over a period of several years.

== Early life ==
Very little is known about Beloruscev's early life. He was born in Krasnokamsk in 1967, and developed an addiction to alcohol in the mid-1980s. During the Soviet and post-Soviet years, he has been convicted four times on different charges.

== Murders ==
In 2009, Beloruscev was arrested for murdering three people in Krasnokamsk. While drinking alcohol together, a quarrel occurred between Beloruscev and his three acquaintances, during which he bludgeoned them to death with a dumbbell disk and stabbed them multiple times. On 10 September 2010, he was convicted and received a life term, after which he was transferred to the Black Dolphin Prison to serve his sentence. Over the following years, he would periodically contact the Investigative Committee of Perm Krai and confess to nine additional murders committed between 2001 and 2009.

=== Initial confessions ===
In 2013, he confessed to the murders of three other people who were killed in Krasnokamsk between August 2004 and January 2005. Beloruscev left the colony and was returned to Krasnokamsk, where he was interrogated and took part in interrogative experiments to reproduce what had happened. For the first murder, Beloruscev claimed that he and an acquaintance were walking through the city at night and searching for a place to drink vodka when he noticed that the lights were turned on in a nearby apartment. They decided to go and knock on the door, and when the door was opened, they learned that the homeowner was an elderly woman who lived by herself. The two men then barged inside and started rummaging through cupboards and closets to look for alcohol and money. Beloruscev claimed that he stabbed the woman after she raised a ruckus, tried to kick them out and threatened to call the police. He said that he committed the following two murders in a similar manner. On 20 September 2013, he was convicted via jury trial for the murders and sentenced to another life term.

Between 2015 and 2016, he admitted to two additional murders, for which he was respectively convicted and given two additional life terms by the Perm Regional Court.

=== Fourth and fifth confessions ===
After the second trial, Beloruscev was returned to the Black Dolphin Prison, but in mid-2017, he was again returned to Krasnokamsk after confessing to his ninth murder. According to him, he had murdered an acquaintance surnamed Deriglazov at the man's apartment on Zvezdnaya Street in April 2004. Beloruscev claimed that after getting into an argument with him, he punched Deriglazov twice in the face and then, armed with scissors, he struck him at least four times in the neck and back. One of the cuts caused damage to Deriglazov's larynx on the right carotid artery and the jugular vein, in addition to the stabs in the back, caused him to bleed to death. His testimony was confirmed by a female cohabitant, as she stated that at the time of the crime, she worked as a saleswoman at a kiosk in the Zvezdny neighbourhood and had seen the two men drinking alcohol near her workplace before going to Deriglazov's apartment. At the end of the working day, the woman went to look for Beloruscev and met with a friend, Popova, who told her that the two men were at Deriglazov's apartment, where they got into a fight because the latter was sexually harassing her. She said that Beloruscev threatened to kill Deriglazov and then kicked her out of the apartment.

About an hour after the murder, Beloruscev left the apartment and met the witness on the street, after which she went to the apartment herself and found the corpse. She said that later that day Beloruscev queried her and Popova if they had seen anything suspicious, but neither said that they had seen the body. The two women never contacted the police about this incident, out of fear that Beloruscev would hurt them as well. On 9 November 2017, he was found guilty of Deriglazov's murder and given an additional 10-year sentence to be served concurrently with the existing life sentences.

A few months after the trial, in early 2018, Beloruscev confessed to his tenth murder, committed in March 2004 with the help of a friend, A. S. Zverev. He claimed that while the two were drinking together, he and Zverev stabbed a fellow vagrant out of personal animosity, after which they dismembered the corpse. They then took the remains and clothes and scattered them across the neighbourhood, which was reported to the police a few days later by horrified residents. Beloruscev was escorted to the crime scenes, and pointed out where the two had dumped the remains. His testimony was completely consistent with that of Zverev and the findings of medical examiners, but despite this, he still decided to retract this confession. Nevertheless, he was found guilty of this murder on 16 March 2020, and given an additional 16 years imprisonment. However, as the statute of limitations had passed, Beloruscev was instead returned to the Black Dolphin Prison and served out his remaining life sentences.

=== Sixth confession ===
After spending three more years in prison, Beloruscev wrote another letter to the Investigative Committee in early 2023, confessing to his eleventh known murder. His victim was a local woman named Natalia Korneenkova, the mother of a small child who had been listed as a missing person for a long time. On 3 January 2003, Korneenkova quarrelled with her roommate and went to visit a friend named Zevakina, who herself was living with Beloruscev at the time. During the visit, he raped her in the toilet and then strangled her with a scarf, after which he took her jewellery, 400 rubles and a Nokia 3310. Zevakina claimed that when she returned to the room, Korneenkova was already dead, a claim corroborated by Beloruscev, who added that he threatened to kill her if she did not have sex with him on the sofa, where he had placed the murdered woman's body, after which he left Zevakina go.

Beloruscev then told the investigators that he kept the woman's body on his balcony for several days, after which he dismembered it and scattered the remains around Krasnokamsk. Some passers-by found fragments of her pelvis and thigh bones soon after, but the skull was only found in 2007 near a boiler room. After remaining silent for more than 20 years, Zevakina finally came forward and admitted that she was afraid that Beloruscev would do something to harm her, even if he was still incarcerated.

== 2023 trial ==
During the trial, a forensic examination was conducted in order to determine whether Beloruscev could face the charges. The expertise concluded that he had an organic personality disorder brought on by alcohol addiction, causing him to be very irritable, but was nonetheless deemed sane and cognizant of his actions. As a result, he was later convicted of Korneenkova's murder and sentenced to 13 years imprisonment.

After the trial, Beloruscev unexpectedly decided to appeal the verdict. On 30 October 2023, a hearing was held in which he appeared in court via video link and changed his original testimony, claiming that he had in fact been aided by Zverev and none other than Zevakina herself. This time, Beloruscev claimed that Zverev was the actual killer and the one who dismembered the corpse, while Zevakina was the one who had proposed the idea to rob Korneenkova. However, Zverev denied this when questioned, claiming that he had never met Korneenkova and was not in the apartment when the murder was committed.

Beloruscev claimed that he had incriminated himself out of curiosity and accused Zevakina, a witness to the crime, of perjury. He described in detail for several minutes what the sofa looked like in his apartment, accusing Zevakina of giving an incorrect description of it, which supposedly should have invalidated her testimony. Due to this, he demanded that the verdict be overturned, but this was rejected and has since remained unchanged.

=== Seventh confession ===
In 2024, Beloruscev admitted to his twelfth known murder, and chronologically, his first known one. He claimed that sometime in 2001, he attended a party on Entuziastov Street in a drunken state and started rummaging through the cabinets in search of valuables. The owner, an elderly pensioner, attempted to kick him out and grabbed a nearby axe. However, Beloruscev snatched it from his hands and then crashed it into his skull, killing the man.

He then stole 300 rubles from the man's trousers, as well as a bag filled with bottles and dishes, then covered up the victim's corpse and left. For this crime, he was given an additional 12 years to be served concurrently with his already existing sentences.

== See also ==
- List of people sentenced to more than one life imprisonment
- List of Russian serial killers
