= Andrei Melyukh =

Russian serial killer (born 1977)

- Born: Andrei Fyodorovich Melyukh; 23 January 1977 (age 49); Kanashevo, Chelyabinsk Oblast, RSFSR
- Other names: "The Brick Maniac" "The Yuzhnouralsky Raskolnikov"
- Convictions: Murder x10 Attempted murder x6 Robbery x5
- Penalty: Life imprisonment

Details
- Victims: 10
- Span of crimes: 2000–2002
- Country: Russia
- State: Chelyabinsk
- Date apprehended: For the final time on 8 February 2002
- Imprisoned at: Black Dolphin Prison, Sol-Iletsk, Orenburg Oblast

Andrei Fyodorovich Melyukh (Russian: Андрей Фёдорович Мелюх; born 23 January 1977), known as The Brick Maniac (Russian: Кирпичный маньяк), is a Russian serial killer who killed ten pensioners and wounded ten more during robberies in Chelyabinsk from 2000 to 2002. He was eventually captured, convicted and sentenced to life imprisonment.

== Early life ==
Andrei Fyodorovich Melyukh was born on 23 January 1977, in the village of Kanashevo, Chelyabinsk Oblast. He was raised in a dysfunctional family, as his father, Fyodor Melyukh, was repeatedly tried for property crimes and his mother was an alcoholic. Due to these circumstances, the young Melyukh was eventually sent away to an orphanage, where he spent his formative years. In 1997, he was sentenced to 3 years imprisonment for robbing a pensioner the previous year and served out his sentence in full, being released sometime in 2000.

After his release, Melyukh was unable to find a decent job and thus unable to financially support his elderly father and his girlfriend, who had two children from a previous marriage. As a result, he resorted to robbing elderly women.

== Murders and robberies ==
Melyukh's modus operandi consisted of staking out for potential victims at a convenience store on Lenin Avenue and Engels Street during daylight hours, singling out elderly women who carried bags of groceries. When he found a suitable victim, he would follow her home and then break in, hitting on the back of the head with a brick before stealing their belongings. Several of Melyukh's victims managed to survive but were unable to remember their attacker's face.

Melyukh's first recorded attack took place on an undisclosed date in 2000 when he attacked a woman named Ella Dergachyova and stole items worth 3,000 rubles. In September 2001, he attacked 77-year-old Irina Kruglova and stole 100 rubles, but this time, the attack proved fatal.

On 3 October, Melyukh committed two attacks in the same day: he first robbed 79-year-old Serafima Bondar and stole 20 rubles and a kilo of apples, before proceeding to kill 60-year-old Lyudmila Mironova later in the day, from whom he took a bag of groceries.

On 12 October, Raisa Buzuyeva, the mother of the Chief of the Department of Internal Affairs of Chelyabinsk, was killed in an assault. On November 16, 86-year-old Liya Mayzel, a retired professor and former dean of the Chelyabinsk State Pedagogical University, was murdered in similar circumstances and robbed of 200 rubles. After this killing, the regional prosecutor's office got involved and panic began to take over the city's residents.

A break in the case came not long after, as one of Melyukh's surviving victims, 70-year-old Nadezhda Elizarova, told detectives that she had been struck by a man wearing a camouflage jacket. Using this information, operatives were stationed at the Chelyabinsk Railway Station and checked all men wearing similar attire.

On 8 February 2002, Melyukh attempted to rob 75-year-old Pavla Shlykova, but she did not lose consciousness after being hit on the head and was able to call for help. Later that day, Melyukh was arrested by police officers Yevgeny Rusinov and Talgat Sirazhitdinov, who were patrolling the area and accidentally stumbled across him. Whilst he fiercely resisted cooperating initially, he ultimately confessed to the crimes during an interview with investigators working on the case.

== Trial and imprisonment ==
Before his trial, Melyukh was ordered to undergo a psychiatric evaluation, which determined that he was sane both during the commission of the crimes and during the investigation. When put on trial, he unexpectedly recanted his testimony, claimed that he had been coerced into confessing and pleaded guilty only to four of the robberies. When put on the stand, Melyukh gave several shoddy alibis concerning activities he had supposedly done when the murders were committed - among them was being drunk for several days after celebrating his birthday; digging potatoes and going on a trip to see the town of Shchuchye in Kurgan Oblast with his girlfriend.

In spite of his claims of innocence, Melyukh was found guilty on all counts and sentenced to life imprisonment by the Chelyabinsk Regional Court on 14 November 2002. In addition to this, he was later sued by the surviving victims and ordered to pay them 500,000 rubles, which was later reduced to 200,000 by the court. He attempted to appeal his sentence to the Supreme Court, which upheld the conviction. He was then transferred to the Black Dolphin Prison, where he remains as of November 2022.

== See also ==
- List of Russian serial killers
