= Farit Gabidullin =

Russian serial killer and rapist

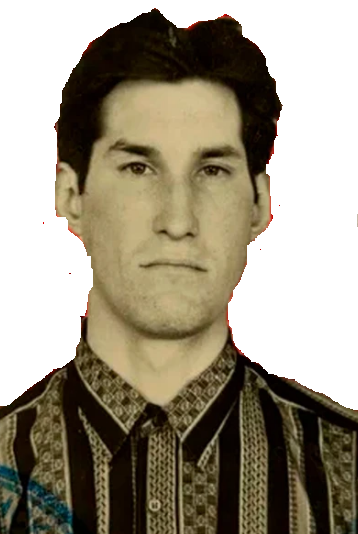
- Born: Farit Gabdulkhayevich Gabidullin; 5 December 1972 (age 53); Chelyabinsk, Chelyabinsk Oblast, RSFSR
- Convictions: Murder x10 Rape
- Penalty: Life imprisonment

Details
- Victims: 10
- Span of crimes: 1989–2000
- Country: Soviet Union, later Russia
- State: Chelyabinsk
- Date apprehended: October 2000
- Imprisoned at: Black Dolphin Prison, Sol-Iletsk, Orenburg Oblast

Timur Gabidullin
- Born: Timur Gabdulkhayevich Gabidullin; 5 December 1972 (age 53); Chelyabinsk, Chelyabinsk Oblast, RSFSR
- Convictions: Murder x4 Rape
- Penalty: 25 years imprisonment

Details
- Victims: 4
- Span of crimes: 1989–2000
- Country: Russia
- State: Chelyabinsk
- Date apprehended: October 2000

Farit Gabdulkhayevich Gabidullin (Russian: Фарит Габдулхаевич Габидуллин; born 5 December 1972) and Timur Gabdulkhayevich Gabidullin (Russian: Тимур Габдулхаевич Габидуллин; born 5 December 1972) are Soviet-Russian twin brothers and serial killers who were responsible for at least 14 murders and rapes of young girls and women around Chelyabinsk Oblast from 1989 to 2000. Both were convicted and sentenced for their respective roles in the crimes, but some suspect that they might have killed many more people than the amount they were convicted of.

== Early life ==
The Gabidullin brothers were born on 5 December 1972, in Chelyabinsk. They came from a disadvantaged background, as both of their parents were alcoholics and their father – a repeat criminal offender – was incarcerated shortly after they were born. At only three years old, both brothers were abandoned by their mother and left in the care of their grandmother, while she left her home and began to live on the streets.

Early on in their childhood, both Farit and Timur began to show signs of mental illness, and after they were officially diagnosed as intellectually disabled, they were put in special education. Neither showed any interest in completing their education, as a result of which, the brothers spent their time messing around, refusing to make friends with their peers and constantly angering their grandmother. Farit and Timur's favourite pastime was to wander about on the streets or the nearby cemetery, where they vandalized monuments and desecrated graves.

After the death of their grandmother and their graduation from high school, the Gabidullin brothers made a living by committing petty thefts and doing odd jobs but never managed to stay in one workplace for a prolonged period of time.

== Arrest and investigation ==
In October 2000, investigators from the Chelyabinsk Police Department detained the brothers on suspicion of raping and murdering a 23-year-old woman. During their interrogations, the twins confessed to raping and brutally killing the victim on the train tracks, but to the investigators' shock, they also admitted to committing a total of 30 such crimes in the region. According to Farit, their very first victim was their own mother, whom they killed during a quarrel in 1989. He claimed that both of them dismembered her body and then buried the remains somewhere in the woods on the outskirts of Chelyabinsk, as authorities were unable to find the supposed location, she is officially still listed as a missing person.

The brothers claimed that all of their subsequent victims were children, young girls, and marginalized members of society. Their modus operandi consisted of picking victims at random at the train or bus station, after which they would offer them to have a drink at Mitrofanovsky Cemetery. If the circumstances favoured the criminals, they would attack their chosen victim, sexually assaulting, and then killing them in various manners. A large proportion of their victims were from other towns or homeless, due to which their disappearances were treated negligently by local police. According to Farit, a number of their victims were gullible pensioners they had met on the streets of Chelyabinsk, to whom they offered to carry heavy items or walk them home. If they managed to gain the victim's trust or they lived alone, they would break into their apartment, sexually assault the victim, and then kill them.

Farit, who appeared to be the leader of the pair, said to the investigators that their youngest victim was a 12-year-old girl named Nadya Malchikova. He said that after spotting her in one of the city parks, he attempted to persuade her to get intimate with him – when she refused, Farit tore off her clothes and inflicted several superficial cuts on her body with his knife. He admitted to attempting to rape Malchikova, but was unable to sustain an erection at the sight of her blood. Farit claimed that he tortured her for the next four hours, beating and sodomizing Malchikova with dry branches, a piece of iron wire, the handle of his knife, and a rusty pump. After she finally lost consciousness, he dragged her to a nearby anthill and set her body on fire, killing her in the process.

In their confessions, the brothers indicated that they buried the bodies in the Mitrafanovsky Cemetery, near the automechanical plant. During an investigative experiment, Farit indicated a potential grave, and after digging a hole three meters down, law enforcement officers unearthed more than 100 human skulls and several hundred bone fragments. Autopsies determined that most of them had been killed by some sort of traumatic brain injury or were shot in the head. Due to this, it was determined that some of the remains belonged to victims of the Red Terror that had been buried here, but the remaining portion belonged to people whose deaths occurred in the 1990s. Because of this, investigators suspected that the Gabidullin brothers were telling at least the partial truth and were responsible for multiple additional murders.

== Trial and imprisonment ==
Ultimately, prosecutors managed to prove the brothers' involvement in 14 murders. While the Gabidullins recanted their confessions and pleaded not guilty, they were nonetheless found guilty by the Chelyabinsk Regional Court on October 11, 2001. Farit Gabidullin was found guilty of 10 murders and sentenced to life imprisonment, while Timur was found guilty of four and sentenced to 25 years imprisonment. The reason for Timur's more lenient sentence was due to the fact that the court judges determined that his actual role in the organization and planning of the murders was minimal, and he just acted on his twin brother's orders.

=== Aftermath ===
After his conviction, Gabidullin was transported to the Black Dolphin Prison, where he remains as of 2022. In May 2021, he contacted the Chelyabinsk Oblast Prosecutor's Office and confessed to another murder – he claimed that in 2002, he had attacked a man in the lavatory of a railway station in Zlatoust and stabbed him in the abdomen and chest, killing him. His testimony was almost instantaneously dismissed, as the alleged crime had occurred two years after he and his brother were arrested. Following this incident, additional medical examinations were ordered for Farit, and he is presumably undergoing treatment.

== See also ==
- List of Russian serial killers
