= Sergey Shipilov =

Russian serial killer and rapist

- Born: Sergey Aleksandrovich Shipilov; 17 May 1959 (age 67); Arkhangelsk, Arkhangelsk Oblast, RSFSR
- Other names: "The Velsk Chikatilo" "The Velsk Maniac" "The Arkhangelsk Chikatilo"
- Conviction: Murder
- Penalty: Life imprisonment

Details
- Victims: 14
- Span of crimes: 1995–1999
- Country: Russia
- State: Arkhangelsk
- Weapon: Cord
- Date apprehended: 10 October 1999
- Imprisoned at: Black Dolphin Prison, Sol-Iletsk, Orenburg Oblast

Sergey Aleksandrovich Shipilov (Russian: Серге́й Алекса́ндрович Шипи́лов; born 17 May 1959), known as The Velsk Chikatilo (Russian: Вельский Чикатило), is a Russian rapist and serial killer sentenced to life imprisonment for 14 murders and nine rapes. Most of his murders took place in the town of Velsk. The majority of his victims were women that he raped before killing.

== Early life ==
Shipilov was born on 17 May 1959, in Arkhangelsk to a simple, working-class family. Shipilov had a sister two years his junior. His mother died when he was seven years old. Shipilov claims his father then began to bring women and alcohol into their home.

In his early life, Shipilov received a secondary special education, served in the army, married, and had three children. He worked as a foreman in a vocational school, where he taught students how to drive. At work, he was viewed positively by his co-workers. In view of this, he was able to use the official car at his own discretion.

== Initial crimes ==
The first murder Shipilov committed was in 1995, when he robbed and then killed a woman. However, he did not confess to this crime until 2016.

In 1996, a series of rapes and murders began. While Shipilov was driving his truck, he picked up a fellow traveller. He claims that while inebriated, the woman agreed to an intimate relationship. However, Shipilov then killed the woman, stabbing her multiple times. The blade broke during the killing and stuck in the victim's body. Later Shipilov admitted to being afraid that the victim would come to his house and tell his wife about the betrayal. He buried the woman's corpse in the vicinity of Arkhangelsk's brickworks.

That same year he killed two more women in the same way. Another woman was killed by a blow to the head. The victims' bodies were buried in the Primorsky District; they were found only after Shipilov was captured.

In late 1996, Shipilov committed a rape. The victim managed to escape (according to other sources, he let her go), and she reported him to the police. Shipilov was subsequently arrested. In the trunk of his car, a bead from one of the victims' ornaments was found. In addition, it was found that he had committed eight more rapes in 1996. On 16 January 1997, the Primorsky District Court sentenced him to eight years imprisonment in a general regime colony. He was not even suspected in the three murders.

Later, while serving his life sentence, Shipilov said that there was no rape: the sexual intercourse with the woman had been by mutual agreement, and that she had submitted a statement "in order to make money from it".

== In the colony ==
Arriving in Colony UG-42/14 in Velsk, Shipilov came up with a unique scheme which he used to commit all his crimes. This colony worked under the so-called beskonvoynaya (бесконвойная - "infinityless") system of detention, where convicts could move freely throughout the colony. On occasion, inmates could even travel beyond its borders for any administrative needs. Shipilov understood immediately that this could be used for his criminal purposes. In the summer of 1998, as a reward for good behaviour, he was allowed to drive the colony's honeywagon. On 8 December 1998, he killed his fourth victim, a woman named Doilnitsyna. Unlike his other victims, he did not bury her body but only covered it with branches. After that, Shipilov hid as he was afraid of getting caught. When he returned later to the crime scene and found that the body had not been discovered, he buried it and decided to continue committing murders. He committed his next murder on 16 May 1999. A week later, on 24 May, Shipilov killed another woman. He buried the bodies at the final point of his route, the dump.

Between 11 June and 27 June, Shipilov committed four more murders. Two of the victims were middle-aged women, two were young girls. According to his confession made after his arrest, "he was sorry for the young virgins", so he switched to killing only middle-aged women. Then, in August, Shipilov hid again. Between 22 and 24 September, he committed his last murders.

Each of the murders was carefully committed. He picked up women on deserted roads, and since the inside passenger door handle was removed, they had no way to escape from the truck. On the way, he offered the women vodka and when he was refused, he stopped in a deserted place and killed them.

In one of the interviews, Shipilov told reporters that he only killed those victims he considered were prostitutes. He claimed that he always let any woman who refused to drink with him leave. However, later investigations found that he poured the alcohol violently into his victims.

== Arrest, trial and sentencing ==
The investigation team set up under the Prosecutor's Office of the Arkhangelsk Oblast, were unsuccessful in their investigation into the disappearing women. Nevertheless, one day they noticed Shipilov's honeywagon pass by a place where one of the victims had disappeared. Investigators learned that a honeywagon from the UG-42/14 Colony often passed by on the same road. Since Shipilov's schedule coincided with the time of the murders, he was detained. Initially, there was no evidence against him, and for a long time, Shiplov did not provide any evidence. Later Shipilov lost his nerve and attempted suicide by cutting his veins. He was saved by doctors and subsequently confessed to committing 12 murders, including the three before his conviction. During his interrogation, he calmly related the details of how he raped and killed his victims. Demonstrating a sharp memory, he described in detail the atrocities and pointed out the burial locations with great accuracy. When asked by the investigators if he had intended to continue killing, he replied that he did and that he had even "figured out different ways of killing his victims". Despite raping each victim, Shipilov denied sexual gratification was his main motive. According to his own words, he was motivated only by the thirst of "crime for the sake of crime".

On 25 October 2000, the Arkhangelsk Regional Court convicted Shipilov of 12 murders and nine rapes. He was sentenced to life imprisonment due to the moratorium in Russia on the death penalty. The Supreme Court of Russia upheld the verdict without change, and Shipilov was sent to the Black Dolphin Prison correctional facility in the city of Sol-Iletsk.

== Post-sentencing confessions ==
On 25 May 2016, Shipilov confessed to committing several more crimes. He was sent to the Arkhangelsk Central, where he sits in a single solitary cell. He confessed to two additional murders committed in 1995 and 1996, for which he was sentenced to nine-and-a-half years of imprisonment. This punishment was absorbed into his sentence of life imprisonment.

Experts do not rule out that Shipilov, in order not to return to the Black Dolphin, can stay in Arkhangelsk Central for a couple of years and possibly remember any other crimes he committed earlier.

== In the media ==
- Criminal Russia. Infernal Barrel (2001).
- Lifetime deprived of liberty Maniacs from the Black Dolphin (2010).
- Invisible battle: Anomalous Zone (2013).

== See also ==
- List of Russian serial killers
- List of serial killers by number of victims
