= Sergey Maduev =

Soviet brigand and killer (born 1956)

- Born: Ali Arbievich Maduev; 17 June 1956; Karaganda, Karaganda Region, Kazakh SSR
- Died: 10 December 2000 (aged 44); Black Dolphin Prison, Sol-Iletsk, Orenburg Oblast, Russia
- Other names: "Chervonets" "Thief-outside-the-law"
- Conviction: Murder
- Penalty: Death; commuted to life imprisonment

Details
- Victims: 10
- Span of crimes: 1988–1990
- Country: Soviet Union
- States: Rostov, Astrakhan, St. Petersburg, Tashkent
- Date apprehended: 1990

Sergey Alexandrovich Maduev (Russian: Серге́й Алекса́ндрович Маду́ев; born Ali Arbievich Maduev (Russian: Али́ Арби́евич Маду́ев); 17 June 1956 – 10 December 2000) was one of the famous Soviet brigands, as well as a serial killer. He had the nickname "Chervonets", but he called himself "Thief-outside-the-law". Despite beginning his criminal activity in the 1970s, his most high-profile crimes occurred at the very end of the 1980s, which is why Maduev today is regarded as one of the last criminals of the Soviet era.

Maduev achieved notoriety after an unsuccessful attempt to escape from Kresty Prison in March 1991, with the help of a female investigator whom he had seduced.

== Childhood and first convictions ==
Ali Arbievich Maduev was born in a Karaganda prison, in the Kazakh SSR, the fourth child of a Chechen man convicted of resisting deportation and a Korean woman convicted of speculation. After his release, Maduev's father abandoned the family. Maduev began to steal at the age of six, and in August 1974, he received his first prison term by the Karasay District Court in Almaty Region, which gave him 6 years for complicity in theft. After leaving prison in 1980, Maduev engaged in various thefts and robberies, for which he was given another 15 years imprisonment in February 1981.

During his second term, Maduev withstood an attack by 12 criminals, who intended to kill him because he had appropriated an obtshak of some thieves in law from Tbilisi and Tashkent. Maduev gained authority for this, became a team leader and received the nickname "Chervonets". Nevertheless, other criminals considered him a "lawless" man, always ready to use his weapon if necessary.

== Escape and new crimes ==
In 1988, Maduev was transferred to an open prison, from which he immediately fled and was put on a wanted list. At first, a wave of impudent thefts and robberies swept across the USSR - Maduev's tracks covered the areas of Siberia, the Moscow Oblast and Grozny. The Grozny robbery victim said that Maduev had prevented his accomplice from raping the man's daughter. In another instance, one of Maduev's victims suddenly felt ill, after which Maduev went to a pharmacy in a neighbouring house and called an ambulance for the person he had just robbed. Thanks to this, the victim's life was saved.

Soon, however, Maduev began killing his victims. The first was a triple murder in Rostov Oblast, committed along with accomplice Roman Chernyshev. The victims were the Shalumov spouses, who tried to make noise during the robbery. In order to cover their tracks, the two criminals set fire to the house, burning alive the couple's 1-year-old son in the process. A bullet extracted from one of the corpses was found to be fired from a ČZ vz. 27, a rare firearm in the Soviet Union. A white Volga was also seen at the crime scene, and when the car was found later on, another bullet, fired from the same pistol, was also located. The owner of the car explained that he had given it to his brother-in-law, Sergey Maduev. After this, Maduev was again put on the Interunion Wanted List.

On 6 June 1989, Maduev and Chernyshev committed a double murder with the aim of robbery in the Astrakhan Oblast. After this, Maduev travelled around the country: in the Uzbek SSR, he stole 200,000 roubles from some thieves in law's obtshak, flying under the criminals' radar. Then, Maduev robbed a Georgian thief-in-law, whose clan later declared war on him. In the same year, he committed a number of robberies in Leningrad, one of which ended with a severe wound to the victim. She died in February 1990, when Maduev had already been arrested. Soon after that, Maduev shot and killed a doorman in a Leningrad cafe, in front of tens of people. After that, he turned around and asked: "Maybe someone else wants to?".

In January 1990, Maduev and Chernyshev arrived in Tashkent, planning to commit a robbery on the next day. The brigands were strongly resisted, however, and Chernyshev was wounded. Instead of helping his companion, Maduev killed him and the homeowner with a pistol. The day after, Maduev was detained and handcuffed by a policeman at the Tashkent railway station. Suddenly, the hardened criminal took out a grenade from his inner pocket, demanding to be released. After much persuasion, he agreed to be sent to the police station, where, on his orders, the officer burned Maduev's notebook. The police officers then disarmed him and took the grenade, only to discover that it was a dummy.

== Investigation, escape and sentence ==
Maduev was transferred to the Kresty Prison in Leningrad. Having no doubts that he would be executed, he willingly testified, handed over his accomplices, indicated the crime scenes and signed the protocols without even reading them. He was charged with more than 60 crimes, at least 10 of which were murders.

On 3 May 1991, the convoy was supposed to take Maduev to Moscow, where two of his accomplices were already serving sentences - the Murzabekov brothers. Unexpectedly for the guards, Maduev pulled out a revolver from his bosom, shot at the wall and ordered to be released. He tried to run away, shooting at Major Ermolaev, who was later barely saved. Maduev was captured, and investigators began to start an inquiry into how he had acquired the gun. It turned out that it was a revolver stolen from a safe in the prosecutor's office, with which Maduev had committed his murders in Leningrad and Tashkent.

A special investigation team was created for the attempted escape, spearheaded by the Vyborgsky District prosecutor Kruglov. But, in fact, the entire volume of operational investigative actions was carried out by the KGB. One of the colonels, Vladimir Georgiev, figured out who had provided the weapon: it was Natalya Vorontsova, an investigator from the team assigned to the Maduev case. Women were attracted to Maduev, which he used to his advantage. Vorontsova was later given a 7-year imprisonment term, and her story formed the basis of the film "Prison Romance", with actor Aleksandr Abdulov playing the role of Sergey Maduev.

Maduev tried to escape on two other occasions: on the first try, he tried to escape using a pistol, which was hidden in some bread. On the guard, he used a gun supplied by a female guard. She was later arrested, and during interrogation, assured the examining authorities that the criminal had hypnotized her.

On 10 July 1995, the St. Petersburg City Court sentenced Sergey Maduev to death for two of the murders and many of his other crimes. However, due to the introduction of the moratorium, the death penalty was replaced with life imprisonment. Initially, Maduev was housed in Kresty Prison and then in Novocherkassk, and in November 2000, he was transferred to the Black Dolphin Prison. On December of that same year, he died from heart failure and diabetes complications.

== Cinematography ==
- Prison Romance (1993) - starring Aleksandr Abdulov, the film is based on Maduev's life story.
- Capercaillie (1994) - 20 episodes, starring Vladimir Yeryomin, the series is based on Maduev's life story.
- The Crime of the Wolf, Yorkshire TV, 1996.
- Cruel Romance. Criminal stories (2007, unfinished) - based on Maduev's life story.
- Plague ("Nineties") (2015) - 24 episodes, starring Aleksandr Ustyugov, the series is partially based on Maduev's life story.
- The Maduev case. Sentenced by All. - documentary film from the series "Criminal Russia" (NTV, 1995).
- Documentary film The Last Bandit of the Soviet Union, from the series "Sentenced to life", hosted by Vakhtang Mikeladze.
- Smoothie - documentary film from the series "Investigators waged..." (NTV).
- Chervonets - documentary film from the series "Legends of the Soviet Investigation".
- The Last criminal of the USSR Sergey Maduev - documentary film from the series "Without a statute of limitations" (Channel Moscow. Trust, broadcast on 24 December 2013).
- A cage for 'Robin Hood' - documentary film from the series "Law is Law".

== See also ==
- List of Russian serial killers
