= Yevgeny Nagorny =

Serial killer (born 1972)

- Born: Yevgeny Olegovich Nagorny; 26 June 1972 (age 54); Kharkiv Oblast, UkSSR
- Conviction: Murder
- Penalty: Life imprisonment

Details
- Victims: 10
- Span of crimes: January – May 1998
- Country: Russia
- State: Moscow
- Imprisoned at: Black Dolphin Prison, Sol-Iletsk, Orenburg Oblast

Yevgeny Olegovich Nagorny (Russian: Евге́ний Оле́гович Наго́рный; born 26 June 1972) is a Ukrainian-born serial killer, who organized a car repair service in which he killed the vehicle owners in order to sell their cars.

== Early life ==
Yevgeny Nagorny was born on 26 June 1972, in the Kharkiv Oblast. After graduation, he moved to Moscow, where he went to college. After studying for a year, he was drafted into the army by the early 1990s. After completing his service in the army, he returned to Moscow, at which time he was reinstated at the institute and continued his studies. However, due to the difficult socio-economic situation in the country and problems with future employment, Nagorny was forced to quit school and find a job. He mastered the mechanic profession and soon decided to go into business, opening the AutoLux service centre in a hangar rented by him on the territory of one of the military units on the Projected Drive.

However, things did not go well for the company: there was not enough money to either purchase spare parts or to rent. And soon in the hangar one customer's expensive Jeep burned down. Creditors and the owner of the Jeep began to threaten Nagorny, and he soon came up with a simple scheme: to kill the owners of expensive cars, find them through newspaper ads, and then sell the new cars.

Nagorny took on an assistant by the name of Sergei Stavitsky who was eady to do anything for money, and the pair would commit all subsequent crimes together.

== Crimes ==
The criminal pair's modus operandi was to place car repair service ads in the newspaper "From hand to hand", and schedule a meeting with the victims once the ad drew a response. During the pre-sale inspection of the car, the pair would say it was necessary to bring the vehicle inside the service station to check it in detail. Once inside the hangar they would kill the owners with a pistol and dump their bodies into the sewers through a manhole located inside the hangar, after which the pair could sell the vehicles at their leisure.

The first crime Nagorny and Stavitsky committed was on 2 January 1998, their first victim being the owner of a Lada Niva. Since the Niva could only be sold for cheap, almost all the following murders committed by Nagorny and Stavitsky were against owners of foreign cars.

After this, Nagorny and Stavitsky committed another 9 murders. Their victims were company executives, car drivers and even other criminals: for example, in March 1998 they killed two members of the Solntsevskaya Bratva in their hangar.

The loot from the murders was rich: three Grand Cherokees, a Mitsubishi Pajero, an Audi, a VAZ-2109 and three Mercedes-Benz jeeps. Nagorny soon sold all of them, naturally, at a low price: the maximum amount they got from selling a car was 8,000 dollars.

== Arrest, trial and sentence ==
The killers were traced and caught by accident: when Nagorny was negotiating with his latest victim in a meeting, he did not know that his victim had a caller ID turned on, and the number was registered to the company "AutoLux". When the police arrived at the service station, the hangar was closed, but sounds of active work could be heard from inside, and they decided to wait. Late at night, a Volga arrived at the hangar, from which Stavitsky and a friend disembarked. Both were detained, and the authorities soon broke into the hangar and arrested Nagorny.

All doubts from the investigators were dissipated immediately when, under the hangar's concrete floor, a bag was found containing bloodied items belonging to the victims, including license plates, a pistol holster and an empty magazine. The Makarov pistol itself, which was the weapon used in all the killings, was later found on one of the traverse floor beams under the ceiling. The corpses could not be located on the first day, however.

Nagorny denied everything, but Stavitsky behaved nervously: when left alone for five minutes in the investigative office, he opened his handcuffs with a nail clipper and tried to hang himself using his sneaker's shoelaces. He managed to survive, and when he recovered, he began testifying.

All 10 corpses were found in the sewer and a concreted pit, which was dug under Nagorny's service station, without knowing what it would be intended for. Realizing there was no use of denying, Nagorny confessed to everything.

Stavitsky tried to commit suicide several times more but did not succeed. However, he still managed to avoid punishment, as a forensic psychiatric examination revealed signs of a mental illness, and he was sent for involuntary commitment.

Nagorny was found guilty by the court under the Criminal Code of Russia in April 1999 and sentenced to life imprisonment. At the trial, where, among others, members of the Solntsevskaya Bratva were present, he behaved defiantly, standing with his back to the victims' relatives. When the judge announced the verdict, the gangsters shouted at Nagorny: "We will bury you alive!".

The Supreme Court of Russia upheld the verdict, and these were Nagorny's words while in the Supreme Court: "Why did you give a life sentence to me, a Russian citizen, a patriot who gave you two years of his life in the service of his Homeland, and this Homeland thanks me as much?" When the film crew of "Criminal Russia" came to interview Nagorny after the Supreme Court meeting, he said: "You are catching up with horror in Russia! They called it "Criminal Russia", it's horrific! That you are catching up with the people...show the good things about me! Blood, murder...who needs all this?".

Yevgeny Nagorny is currently serving his sentence at the Black Dolphin Prison.

== Riddles from the investigation ==
Some questions remain unanswered, as few people believed that the murders were committed solely by Nagorny and Stavitsky. Incidentally, Nagorny said this himself at his trial: "I fulfilled the wishes of my clients – influential people and are still respected by me." But who these "clients" were, remains unknown. In his testimony, Stavitsky mentioned that Nagorny was recording client data in a special notebook, but he could not find where he kept it. It is possible that each car was assigned by criminals in a specific order.

== In the media ==
- One episode from the Independent Investigation program (NTV, 2000) was dedicated to the Nagorny case.
- In 2000, the series Criminal Russia had an episode titled "The Car Service of Blood" based on the Nagorny case. In the same year, the movie The Secret of the Underground Crypt was released by Vakhtang Mikeladze's documentary series "Documentary Detective".
- The documentary film Sentenced to the Black Dolphin from Vakhtang Mikeladze's "Sentenced to life" series.
- The documentary film Evil auto repair shop, directed by Andrey Dutov.
- Friedrich Neznansky's novel Criminal Walks and its film adaptation – the film Death by Ad from the TV series "March of the Turkish 3" was based on the Nagorny case.
- The film Business of Blood from the TV series At the corner, at Patriach 4, is based on the Nagorny case.
- The documentary film Death Machine from the TV series First Blood (NTV, 2010).

== See also ==
- List of Russian serial killers
- List of serial killers by number of victims
