= Viktor Bolkhovsky =

Russian serial killer

- Born: Viktor Nikolayevich Bolkhovsky; 1959 (age 66–67); Kemerovo Oblast, RSFSR
- Other names: "The Necromancer Maniac"; Dmitri Ivanovich
- Convictions: Damaging state property (1977); Non-aggravated murder (1980); Hooliganism (1988); Sending threatening letters (1992); Theft (1994); Aggravated murder x3 (2001); Child sexual abuse (2001)
- Penalty: 6 months of correctional labor (1977); 9 years and 6 months imprisonment (1980); 6 years and 2 months imprisonment (1988); 6 months imprisonment (1992); 3 years imprisonment (1994); Life imprisonment (2001)

Details
- Victims: 4
- Span of crimes: 1980–1999
- Country: Soviet Union, Russia
- States: Kemerovo, Zabaykalsky
- Date apprehended: For the final time on 12 November 1999
- Imprisoned at: Black Dolphin Prison, Sol-Iletsk, Orenburg Oblast

Viktor Nikolayevich Bolkhovsky (Russian: Виктор Николаевич Болховский; born 1959), known as The Necromancer Maniac (Russian: Маньяк-некромант), is a Russian serial killer and rapist. After serving a murder conviction for killing his wife in 1980, he sought out young women through lonely hearts ads, killing three women in Kemerovo and Zabaykalsky from 1998 to 1999. He would later be convicted of these crimes and sentenced to life imprisonment.

== Early life ==
Viktor Bolkhovsky was born in 1959 in Kemerovo Oblast, the third child in what was described as an average family with parents who took great care of their children. Despite this, Bolkhovsky suffered from several traumatic events beginning in 1961, when the 2-year-old fell from a height of 3 metres, receiving a head injury and a concussion. Due to complications brought on from this injury, he began to exhibit concerning behaviour.

Relatives and acquaintances characterized Bolkhovsky as a withdrawn, introverted and impulsive child, and as a teenager, he developed a quick temper and was frequently aggressive towards others. Bolkhovsky himself would later say that he attempted various methods to reduce his stress, but most often would go to the vegetable garden and dig a specific bed to calm himself down. Despite his issues, Bolkhovsky did well at school and was well-regarded as a student.

After finishing the 8th grade, he enrolled at a vocational school in Beryozovsky. Around this time, his parents divorced, leading to his mental state deteriorating further. Bolkhovsky lost interest in studying and eventually had to drop out due to his failing grades. In 1965, he left home and moved to the village of Sosnovye Rodniki, where his father and aunt lived after the divorce. While living there, he got a job at a woodworking factory and met a girl named Svetlana, who was a few years older than him. A few months later, she became pregnant with his child, after which the 17-year-old Viktor married her. In 1977, the couple had a daughter.

In the fall of that same year, Bolkhovsky was drafted into the Soviet Army, but was discharged for unknown reasons and ordered to return home after undergoing a medical examination.

== Early crimes ==
In late 1977, Bolkhovsky was prosecuted for the first time after breaking a window of his neighbour's house, who had come to his wife's aid after hearing that Viktor was beating her. He was found guilty and convicted, receiving 6 months of correctional labour as punishment. After serving out the sentence in full, he returned to his wife and daughter, but due to his new criminal record, he had trouble finding a job. Because of this, he soon began to excessively drink alcohol.

In 1980, during a quarrel with his wife, Bolkhovsky beat and strangled her to death. According to his own confession, while strangling Svetlana, he experienced an orgasm at the sight of his wife dying in his arms, after which he realized that he suffered from perverted sadistic tendencies. He fled the area after committing the murder but turned himself in to the authorities eight days later and confessed to being the killer. He was charged with non-aggravated murder, convicted, and sentenced to 9 years and 6 months imprisonment.

After serving 7 years of his sentence, Bolkhovsky was paroled and moved to Oktyabrsky, Irkutsk Oblast, where he found housing and a job at a repair and mechanical plant. Mere months into his release, however, he would commit another crime.

=== Escalating violence ===
In early 1988, Bolkhovsky got very drunk after the end of a working day, after which he broke a window frame and entered the apartment of a woman he did not know, who at the time was with her 6-year-old child. Once inside, he fully undressed and attempted to assault the woman, but her screams attracted the attention of a male neighbour, who arrived to help and pushed the naked assailant onto the street. Half an hour later, Bolkhovsky repeated the act on a different woman but was again prevented from raping her by her brother, who also pushed him out on the street. An hour after that, Bolkhovsky returned to his workplace and started wrecking things in the plant's utility room, as well as fighting with the manager and other employees. When the police arrived to arrest him, he violently resisted, forcing the officers to tie him up and put him bound in the police car.

At the subsequent trial, Bolkhovsky hurled insults against the court, the victims, the prosecutors and investigators alike, claiming that he was drunk and could not remember anything. In the end, it was ruled that the attempted rapes could not be proven with absolute certainty, due to which he was only convicted of hooliganism and sentenced to 6 years and 2 months imprisonment in a strict regime colony with compulsory treatment for his alcoholism. While in prison, Bolkhovsky somehow managed to find the address of the investigator in his criminal case - upon doing so, he started sending threatening letters to her, saying that he would harm both her and her children.

In 1992, he was convicted of threatening a state official and was given an additional six months imprisonment. During his incarceration, he got interested in the lonely hearts ads and corresponded with two women - one was a divorcee with children who suffered from a disability, and the other was a childless, but physically healthy woman. When he was released in late 1994, Bolkhovsky went to the latter woman, initially working at a factory, but soon quit over a dispute about his wage. He attempted to persuade his cohabitant to go into business, but she did not support his idea, after which Bolkhovsky stole her money and attempted to leave the city, but was arrested by police after the woman discovered that the money was missing.

At this trial, Bolkhovsky convinced the court that he intended to go into business and would eventually return the money, but he was nonetheless found guilty of theft and sentenced to 3 years imprisonment. After being transferred to a penal colony, he resumed correspondence with a disabled woman, who began visiting him and sending him parcels. In 1997, Bolkhovsky and the woman married. During this period, he was characterized positively by the colony's administration, as he was never subjected to any disciplinary penalties, thanks to which he was granted parole in May 1998. Not long after, he found out that his wife was living with another man - this led him to move back to his mother's house in Kemerovo, where he periodically lived with her or his aunt.

Because of his numerous criminal convictions, Bolkhovsky had trouble finding employment, so he attempted to get into selling moonshine. After he failed to make a profit from this venture, he soon started committing murders.

== Murders ==
=== Modus operandi ===
Beginning in the summer of 1998, Bolkhovsky again became interested in dating women by correspondence, seeking out potential partners through the lonely hearts ads. In his ads, he portrayed himself in a variety of ways - a generous businessman; an unhappy husband whose wife is dying of cancer; a merchant who graduated from a geological institute; an FSB employee, etc. Despite his rather unremarkable physical appearance, Bolkhovsky was popular with girls and women, who often agreed to meet him at their residences. After having sex with them, he would either rob or kill them. During this period, his aunt started to notice that Bolkhovsky was becoming more secretive and nervous, while others described him as a dodgy character who received letters from various women in several post offices. Two of his male cousins would later recall an incident in which Bolkhovsky lost his temper and broke a table with a hammer, but as he had foam coming out of his mouth, they believed he was experiencing some sort of seizure. They then tied him up, after which he fell asleep - when he woke up, Bolkhovsky claimed that he could not remember what happened.

Later on, investigators would find stacks of newspapers in his apartment, with Bolkhovsky evidently having spent much time improving his ads and correcting them.

=== Kemerovo murder and flight ===
Bolkhovsky committed his second murder on 4 November 1998, in Kemerovo, with the victim being a 27-year-old tech student named Olga, who was currently working as a tailor from her home. The two met through an ad in the local paper's "With You" section, and during a conversation with her, Bolkhovsky presented himself as an entrepreneur who was searching for a business partner. He persuaded Olga to allow him to meet at her apartment, ostensibly to discuss details of their new joint venture. At about 12 o'clock on 4 November, he told his mother and aunt that he was going to a meeting - he then left for Olga's apartment, and upon arriving, he immediately strangled her. He then stole gold jewellery and a Sharp stereo from the apartment.

Not long after Olga's murder, her mother started searching for the killer by herself, discovering that her daughter had wanted to meet a man through newspaper ads. She then contacted all the newspaper offices and inspected several of the dating ads, noticing that one man had submitted several such ads with identical handwriting, but under different names. Olga's mother soon found one woman who claimed to have met Bolkhovsky on the evening of 4 November, who claimed that she refused to take him to her house because he had a black eye and scratches on his face. As he had introduced himself to her under his real name, authorities quickly linked him to the murder and declared him a fugitive.

=== Murders in Chita ===
After learning of this, Bolkhovsky left Kemerovo and moved to Chita, Zabaykalsky Krai, where he committed his third murder at the end of May 1999. The victim was a 31-year-old woman named Galina, whose body was found by her parents inside her apartment on Lenin Street on 31 May. Local investigators quickly established that Galina had recently met a man through a lonely hearts ad. After having tea with her, Bolkhovsky killed her and stole any valuables he could find, including money, gold jewellery and the key to the front door. He also filled the bathroom in her apartment with water and placed cups, saucers and jewellery in there in an attempt to wash off any potential fingerprints.

On 9 November 1999, Bolkhovsky received a letter from a 42-year-old teacher named Elena, whose friend had written in the newspaper on her behalf. Introducing himself as "Dmitri Ivanovich", he claimed to be the director of a television and radio company in Chita whose wife was dying of cancer. Bolkhovsky convinced Elena that he wanted intimacy in exchange for emotional and financial support, to which she agreed. On the following day, after having sex, Elena went to have a shower, allowing Bolkhovsky to search through her apartment for valuables. He found a jewellery box, and after lying to Elena that he was going out to buy some fruits from the local convenience store, he left with the jewellery box. Bolkhovsky pawned the stolen item at a pawn shop, and spent the proceeds on alcohol, meals in restaurants and cab fares.

On the following day, still intoxicated, Bolkhovsky got a cab to drive him to the home of his new acquaintance Zinaida, who lived alone with her 14-year-old daughter Ekaterina. The two had become acquainted after Bolkhovsky presented himself as a logging entrepreneur who did not smoke or drink alcohol. When he arrived at the apartment, Ekaterina had just been picked up by a friend who lived two floors up. As he was noticeably intoxicated, he got into an argument with Zinaida. Angered, Bolkhovsky lost his temper and began to physically assault her. Despite her fierce resistance, Zinaida suffered a multitude of severe injuries which she would eventually succumb to.

A few minutes after killing her, Ekaterina returned to the apartment, whereupon she was accosted by Bolkhovsky. For the next couple of hours, he repeatedly sexually and physically abused her. In her later testimony, Ekaterina claimed that after being grabbed by the throat, she started calling out to her mom - Bolkhovsky then said to her that he was a "professional maniac", and threatened to kill her if she continued screaming. Frightened, she stopped screaming, whereupon Bolkhovsky dragged her to the bedroom, put Ekaterina on top of her mother's corpse and started hugging and kissing her. He then forced her to undress and fry him some eggs in the kitchen, which Bolkhovsky consumed. After finishing with the eggs, he dragged Ekaterina back to the bedroom, where he asked her if she was afraid of dying before tying up her hands with duct tape and her deceased mother's hands and feet.

For the next couple of hours, after being ordered to collect all the gold jewellery and other valuables from the apartment, Bolkhovsky forced Ekaterina to put on pantyhose and do striptease for him.

== Arrest ==
At some point during his abuse of Ekaterina, Bolkhovsky found some champagne in the apartment, which he forced her to drink alongside him. He eventually fell asleep, allowing Ekaterina - naked and her hands still bound with duct tape - to escape the apartment and frantically knock on her neighbour's doorstep. The woman allowed her to go in and let Ekaterina explain what happened, and since they both were afraid to go out through the stairwell, they went down the fire escape to the window of the neighbours who lived on the floor below them. From there, they informed them of what had happened and called the police.

On the early morning of 12 November 1999, a naked and drunken Bolkhovsky was arrested at Zinaida's apartment and dragged off to the police station. After recovering from his drunken stupor, he immediately confessed to committing three murders but went on to change his testimony several times. He claimed that his motive was to "continue [his] self-assertion in the knowledge of the nature of women".

== Trial, sentence and imprisonment ==
In 2000, at the request of his lawyer, Bolkhovsky was transported to the Serbsky Center for a psychological evaluation. There, he was ruled to be sane and capable of standing trial but was diagnosed as a sexual sadist with an interest in necrosadism. In early 2001, Bolkhovsky was found guilty on all counts in relation to three murders, and on 7 February, the Chita Regional Court sentenced him to life imprisonment.

After his conviction, he was transferred to serve his sentence at the Black Dolphin Prison, where he remains to this day. Since then, Bolkhovsky took an interest in studying the Criminal Code of Russia, using it to file several frivolous lawsuits against the prison administration and the Zabaykalsky Krai Prosecutor's Office. One such lawsuit was submitted to the Chita Central District Court on 3 June 2022, in which Bolkhovsky claimed that the Sharp stereo stolen from Olga's apartment had actually been his, and that the police had illegally seized it during the raid of his apartment. On this basis, he demanded that the stereo be returned to him. However, the Chita Central District Court rejected the claim, ruling that Bolkhovsky failed to provide evidence that he had owned the device, pointing to the fact that Olga's sister had correctly identified the stereo's model number (indicated only in the instructions given to the owner), design and even the fact that the sound recording option was not working.

== See also ==
- Lonely hearts killer
- List of Russian serial killers
