= Vladimir Nikolayev (murderer) =

Russian murderer from Novocheboksarsk (born 1959)

- Born: Vladimir Nikolayevich Nikolayev; 16 March 1959; Novocheboksarsk, Soviet Union
- Other names: The Novocheboksarsk Cannibal, The Ogre
- Conviction: Murder
- Penalty: Death, commuted to life imprisonment

Details
- Victims: 2
- Country: Russia

Vladimir Nikolayevich Nikolayev (Russian: Влади́мир Никола́евич Никола́ев) (born March 16, 1959) is a Russian murderer from Novocheboksarsk.

Nikolayev is best known for the cannibalism of his victims, and of distributing and selling their flesh to others in disguise of exotic animal meat.

== Background ==
Prior to his murder convictions, Nikolayev had a long criminal history, first being convicted for theft and robbery in 1980. On his own account, the first murder happened "accidentally" when Nikolayev killed a drinking companion, (who also had a criminal history) during a fist fight. He then carried the victim upstairs to his apartment and attempted to revive him with cold water. When he realized that the man was dead he dismembered his body in the bathtub. Nikolaev has stated via later interview that it was not originally his intent to cannibalize his victims, but rather the idea occurred to him spontaneously while dismembering the first body. He stated that he had originally intended only to bury it. During this first dismemberment Nikolayev removed a portion of flesh from the victim's thigh, which he roasted. Finding the results of this culinary experiment satisfactory, he continued utilizing flesh from his victims as food. Nikolayev distributed the flesh to acquaintances, and even went so far as to sell five kilograms (eleven pounds) at an open market, telling buyers that it was kangaroo meat. He used the money from this venture to buy alcohol. The ruse was at last discovered when some people who ate the product Nikolayev procured as "Saiga trimmings" became suspicious of the taste and submitted it to a doctor. Upon analysis the meat was found to contain human blood. Vladimir Nikolayev was arrested and confessed shortly thereafter. Investigators searched his apartment, where they found human remains and a heavily bloodstained bathtub.

== Sentence ==
In 1997 Vladimir Nikolayev was convicted under articles 105, 152, 162 of the Criminal Code of the Russian Federation. He was sentenced to death. In 1999, by presidential decree, the death penalty was suspended, being replaced by life imprisonment. He has stated that while he is generally against the idea of the death penalty, he would prefer it for himself, rather than continuing to live in prison for the duration of his life. In 2001 he was transferred to IK-6 Black Dolphin Prison. Vladimir Nikolayev was featured in the National Geographic documentary "Russia's Toughest Prisons".

== Additional sources ==
- NatGeo interview with "Vladimir the Cannibal" (English translation)
- Тюрьма Чёрный дельфин, людоед - DTV [Interview: Cannibal of Black Dolphin] (in Russian)

== See also ==
- Black Dolphin Prison
- White Swan (prison)
- Crime in Russia
- capital punishment in Russia
- Nikolai Dzhumagaliev
