= Vadim Krotov =

Russian serial killer and child molester (born 1967)

- Born: Vadim Sergeevich Krotov; 11 February 1967 (age 59); Vasiss, Omsk Oblast, RSFSR
- Other name: The Nakhodka Chikatilo
- Conviction: Murder
- Penalty: Life imprisonment

Details
- Victims: 4
- Span of crimes: 1997–1999
- Country: Russia
- State: Primorsky
- Date apprehended: 1999
- Imprisoned at: Black Dolphin Prison

Vadim Sergeevich Krotov (Russian: Вади́м Серге́евич Кро́тов; born 11 February 1967), known as The Nakhodka Chikatilo (Russian: Находкинский Чикатило), is a Russian serial killer, child molester and producer of child pornography.

== Biography ==
=== Early life ===
Krotov was born in the Omsk Oblast. His father was a doctor, who now lives in Ukraine together with Vadim's mother and sister. He served in Primorye, where he lived, and soon got married. Krotov worked as a docker, and was characterized positively everywhere he went. He led a normal life with his wife, but he divorced her in 1993.

=== Criminal history ===
Since 1994, Krotov invited underage girls to his house, where he gave them alcohol and forced them to pose in obscene poses. As a rule, he only looked for girls who ran away from their parents or were orphaned. After drinking, he raped them. The first murder Krotov committed was on the night of 14 to 15 August 1997. A 15-year-old girl, who was in Krotov's house, began to scream loudly and prevented him from sleeping. The drunken girl either called for help or screamed from fear. The drunken Krotov then walked into the kitchen and strangled her. Then he strangled the second girl who was at his house and slept in the next room, fearing that she would become an unnecessary witness. He then dismembered their bodies in the bathtub, and put the girls' heads in a bag, and their legs and hands in another, scattering them in the nearby forest. After this, he proceeded to kill 2 more girls over two years.

When rumours of the brutal murders of girls crawled through the city, many people who visited Krotov's house said that they assumed who the murderer was. They pointed at him, and soon he was arrested. During the investigation, he showed where he buried the body pieces. On 6 October 1999, the Primorsky Krai Court sentenced Krotov to life imprisonment, and in 2001 he was transferred to the Black Dolphin Prison.

=== Imprisonment ===
While in prison, Krotov gave an interview. In it, he admitted to giving alcohol to children but refused to admit guilt in the production of child pornography, rape and murder.

After 8 November 2011, a message appeared in the media about Krotov's death, but this was later proven to be false. In 2015, Krotov tried to unsuccessfully appeal his sentence.

=== In the media ===
- Documentary film "Sentenced to the Black Dolphin" from the series by Vakhtang Mikeladze "Sentenced to life"

== See also ==
- List of Russian serial killers
