= Vladimir Mukhankin =

Russian serial killer

Vladimir Mukhankin Владимир Муханкин
- Born: Влади́мир Анато́льевич Муха́нкин; Vladimir Anatolyevich Mukhankin; 22 April 1960 (age 66); Zernogradsky District, Rostov Oblast, RSFSR, Soviet Union
- Other names: The Pupil of Chikatilo, Lenin, Midget. Capper
- Years active: 1995
- Convictions: Murder with aggravating circumstances Attempted murder
- Penalty: Death; commuted to life imprisonment

Details
- Victims: 9
- Country: Russia

Vladimir Anatolyevich Mukhankin (Russian: Владимир Анатольевич Муханкин, born 22 April 1960) is a Russian serial killer, convicted for the murder of 9 people in Rostov Oblast in 1995.

== Background ==
Vladimir Anatolyevich Mukhankin was born on 22 April 1960, in the Zernogradsky District in Rostov Oblast, RSFSR, Soviet Union. Mukhankin claimed his father abandoned his pregnant mother for another woman before his birth, and that he had been named in honour of Vladimir Lenin who was also born on 22 April. During his childhood, he was abused at home, also by classmates at school (receiving only 7 years of education), and began to regularly run away from home. As an adult Mukhankin eventually married and had a son that later drowned in the Kuban River.

== Murders ==
In 1995, Mukhankin committed nine murders and two attempted murders, targeting women and girls, mostly in the town of Shakhty, Rostov Oblast. Victims were stabbed or suffocated, some of them tortured before death. Their bodies would be dismembered and sometimes burned. Rape was not a part of his usual modus operandi, but had done so in at least one case; Mukhankin had violated a 13-year-old victim whom he then killed. Mukhankin mainly targeted women and young girls to kill, and it is believed he had an extreme hatred of women.

== Arrest and conviction ==
On 1 May 1995, Mukhankin was arrested after an attack on a woman and her daughter, where the woman was killed but the daughter survived and was able to report Mukhankin as the assailant to the police. After his arrest, it was discovered that he had a plan to kill 40 policemen (the list was found) as revenge for years spent in prison, but was caught before he could enact his plan.

Mukhankin was unremorseful in court and at first, said that he considered himself a disciple of Andrei Chikatilo, a notorious serial killer in Russia who had operated in Rostov Oblast a decade earlier; however, he later referred to Chikatilo as a "chicken". During interrogation, he attempted to convince the police he was insane by acting erratically, but a psychiatric examination found him to be sane, he was diagnosed with psychopathy. Mukhankin was found guilty of 22 crimes, including eight murders (including three minors) and sentenced to the death penalty, but the sentence was commuted to life imprisonment. Mukhankin is currently serving his imprisonment at the Black Dolphin Prison in Orenburg Oblast.

== See also ==
- List of Russian serial killers

== Sources ==
- Охотники на маньяков часть 1
- Охотники на маньяков часть 2
