= Yakhiya Mursalimov =

Russian serial killer

- Born: Yakhiya Khamiduleevich Mursalimov; 1 May 1953 (age 73); Karaguzino, Saraktashsky District, Orenburg Oblast, RSFSR
- Other name: "The Vagabond Maniac"
- Convictions: Murder, 13 victims
- Penalty: Life imprisonment

Details
- Span of crimes: 1998–1999
- Country: Russia
- States: Orenburg Oblast, Republic of Bashkortostan
- Date apprehended: April 14, 1999
- Imprisoned at: Black Dolphin Prison

Yakhiya Khamiduleevich Mursalimov (Russian: Яхия Хамидулеевич Мурсалимов; born 1 May 1953) is a Russian serial killer and robber who committed at least 13 murders in the Orenburg Oblast and the Republic of Bashkortostan between March 1998 and April 1999. As victims, Mursalimov chose elderly women. In 1999, Mursalimov was found guilty of all charges and received life imprisonment as a criminal punishment.

== Early life ==
Yakhiya Mursalimov was born on May 1, 1953, in the village of Karaguzino, Saraktash District, Orenburg Oblast. After graduating from school, Yahia was drafted into the Soviet army in the early 1970s. After serving in the army, Mursalimov returned to his native village, but soon moved to Orenburg, where he got married and got a job as a driver in the private security department of the Dzerzhinsky District of Orenburg. During his service, Mursalimov was characterized positively by his immediate superiors and subsequently received the rank of sergeant. In the late 1980s, after the release of the law "On Cooperation" and the flourishing of the cooperative movement, the protection and racketeering of which brought in large profits, Mursalimov began to spend a lot of time in the company of people leading a criminal lifestyle and became addicted to alcoholic beverages, as a result of which he was fired from law enforcement authorities for appearing at work while intoxicated. Left without work, Mursalimov tried to start a criminal career, but was not successful in this field. During this period, he became the culprit of an accident, hitting a person at a pedestrian crossing, after which he was convicted. Upon his release in the early 1990s, Mursalimov continued his criminal career. In the mid-1990s, he was twice convicted of theft and assault in connection with robbery. Once again, Yakhiya Mursalimov was released in July 1997, after which he returned to Orenburg, where he lived for some time with his wife. According to the testimony of Mursalimov's wife, after his release from prison, Yakhiya experienced difficulties finding employment, as a result of which he was constantly in a state of nervous tension, drank alcoholic beverages almost every day and started scandals with her. On March 8, 1998, Mursalimov once again quarreled with his wife, after which he beat her, packed his things and left home.

== Murders ==
In committing the murders, Yakhiya Mursalimov demonstrated the course of action expressed to him. Leading a vagabond lifestyle, he constantly moved throughout the Orenburg Oblast and the territory of Bashkortostan and never spent the night twice in the same place. Mursalimov committed his first murder a few days after leaving home in March 1998 in Orenburg. His victim was 80-year-old Stepanida Karasyova, with whom he asked to spend the night. The elderly woman refused Mursalimov, after which he attacked her, during which he struck her six times on the head with a shovel, which he found in the yard of the house. Stepanida Karaseva died from her injuries. A few days later, using the same method, he killed another elderly resident of Orenburg with an ax, after which he stole money and other things of material value from her house. On March 25, 1998, Yakhiya Mursalimov met Anastasia Tovstukha. As in previous cases, he entered the courtyard of her house, asking permission to spend the night. After making sure that the woman lived alone in the house, he attacked her, during which he stabbed her 16 times, after which he searched the house, stole money and fled. In total, he committed seven murders in the Orenburg Oblast. Mursalimov's victims were mainly elderly women who were unable to offer the slightest resistance. When committing crimes, he was not extremely careful, as a result of which law enforcement officers found his fingerprints at many murder scenes. At the end of 1998, Maxim Sapozhnikov, an investigator for particularly important cases at the Orenburg Oblast Prosecutor's Office, combined all criminal cases and identified Yakhiya Mursalimov by fingerprints, after which he was put on the wanted list. Having learned about this, Mursalimov at the end of 1998 left the territory of the Orenburg Oblast and moved to Bashkortostan, where, acting according to the same scheme, he committed six more brutal murders.

== Arrest, investigation and trial ==
Yakhiya Mursalimov was arrested on April 14, 1999. During interrogations, he denied his involvement in the crimes but subsequently admitted his guilt. A forensic medical examination found Mursalimov sane. Based on this, the Supreme Court of Bashkortostan on October 22, 1999, found Yakhiya Mursalimov guilty of all charges and sentenced him to life imprisonment.

== Imprisonment ==
After his conviction, Mursalimov was transferred to serve his sentence in correctional colony No. 5 of the Department of the Federal Penitentiary Service for the Vologda Region, better known as the "Vologda Pyatak". In the mid-2000s, he was transferred to serve a further sentence in correctional colony No. 6 of the Department of the Federal Penitentiary Service for the Orenburg Oblast, better known as the "Black Dolphin". After serving 20 years in prison, 66-year-old Yakhiya Mursalimov filed a cassation appeal with the Sol-Iletsky District Court asking for a reduced sentence. Mursalimov, in connection with changes in criminal legislation, demanded that the indications regarding the recognition of the convicted person as a particularly dangerous recidivist and the aggravating circumstance of committing a crime while intoxicated be excluded from the sentence, which would make it possible to achieve the reclassification of his act and the abolition of the criminal penalty in the form of life imprisonment, but the Sol-Iletsky District Court ultimately rejected his complaint.

== See also ==
- List of Russian serial killers
