= Alexander Maslich =

Russian serial killer (1972–2015)

- Александр Маслич
- Maslich at Black Dolphin Prison
- Born: Alexander Valerievich Maslich; 1972; Aleysk, Gorno-Altai Autonomous Oblast, Soviet Union
- Died: 2015 (aged 42 or 43); Black Dolphin Prison, Sol-Iletsk, Orenburg Oblast, Russia
- Penalty: Death; commuted to life imprisonment

Details
- Victims: 5
- Span of crimes: 1980s–1996
- Country: Soviet Union, Russia
- States: Altai Krai, Moscow

Alexander Valerievich Maslich (Russian: Александр Валерьевич Маслич; 1972–2015), also referred to as Andrei Maslich in earlier American reports, was a Russian serial killer who murdered five people, including four fellow inmates.

== Early life ==
Alexander Maslich was born in Aleysk in 1972 in the Gorno-Altai Autonomous Oblast. He had a troubled childhood, as his parents were alcoholics who neglected him, and his frequent misbehaviour and vagrancy led to him being arrested and placed in a boarding school for difficult teenagers. At the boarding school, he experienced beatings and sexual violence from teachers and peers. After his release, Maslich decided to punish paedophiles and rapists due to what he had experienced.

== Murders and imprisonment ==
Although he began with petty thefts and robberies, Maslich eventually killed a man. For this, he was placed in a maximum-security prison colony in the Barnaul village of Kueta. While serving his sentence in 1991, he murdered a fellow inmate, in line with his desire to punish people who committed sex crimes. For this, he was sentenced to an additional 12 years in prison.

While a prisoner in Barnaul's Pre-trial Detention Center No. 1, Maslich shared a cell with an unnamed child molester. One night, his cellmate boasted of his crimes, and Maslich beat him. During an argument a few days later, Maslich strangled his cellmate with a rope and placed the corpse on his bed. Maslich, believing that he would be sent to a psychiatric institution rather than prison had he been considered a cannibal, cut open the man's body and cooked his organs, although he did not eat them.

In 1994, due to his repeated violent behaviour, Maslich was sent to a prison colony in Rubtsovsk for particularly dangerous criminals. At the new prison, Maslich became acquainted with several other inmates, and as they had all desired transfer to a psychiatric institution, they murdered an inmate named Dziuba, who himself had been involved in the planning. Maslich threw a ribbon around Dziuba's neck and suffocated him as others held the man down. They proceeded to cut up the body with a safety razor, drink his blood, and boil some of his organs. Maslich reported that he had tried the liver but couldn't swallow it. The following morning, the prisoners confessed to the murder, announcing to prison guards, "We ate Dziuba! For real!" Each admitted guilt at trial, and after being transferred to the Serbsky Center in Moscow, doctors, realizing the inmates were feigning insanity, declared Maslich and the others sane.

While imprisoned in Moscow, Maslich murdered another cellmate who refused to pay his gambling debt. In December 1996, Maslich was sentenced to death. After a moratorium on the death penalty in Russia was announced shortly after, Maslich's sentence was commuted to life imprisonment. He was then sent to Black Dolphin Prison, where he died in 2015 of undisclosed causes.

== See also ==
- List of Russian serial killers
