= Vladimir Draganer =

Ukrainian-born Russian serial killer

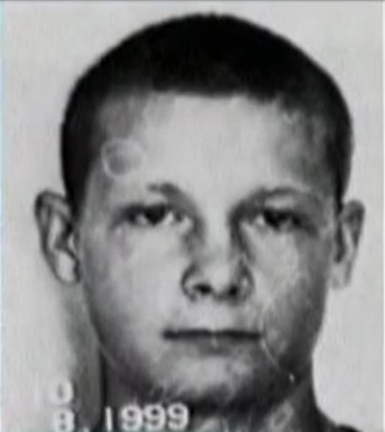
- Born: Vladimir Mikhailovich Draganer; 2 March 1981 (age 45); Liubashivka, Odesa Oblast, Ukrainian SSR
- Other names: "The Kamyshin Maniac" "Dracula" "Dracula's Heir"
- Conviction: Murder
- Penalty: Life imprisonment

Details
- Victims: 5
- Span of crimes: 8 March – 30 August 1999
- Country: Russia
- State: Volgograd
- Date apprehended: 30 August 1999
- Imprisoned at: Black Dolphin Prison in Orenburg

Vladimir Mikhailovich Draganer (Note: In many sources, his name is erroneously spelled "Dragoner") (Russian: Влади́мир Миха́йлович Драгане́р; born 2 March 1981), known as The Kamyshin Maniac (Russian: Камышинский маньяк), is a Ukrainian-Russian serial killer who committed his crimes in the city of Kamyshin, Volgograd Oblast.

== Biography ==
Vladimir Draganer was born on 2 March 1981, in the village of Liubashivka, Odesa Oblast. Later on, he and his mother moved to the city of Kamyshin, where they settled on Bazarov Street. As a child, his mother humiliated him and severely beat Draganer for the slightest offence. After graduating from school, Draganer entered Vocational School Number 14, where he studied in the Crime Commission. He dreamed of serving in the Russian Armed Forces, wanting to learn to use weapons without fear, using them to kill people, which was one of the reasons he committed his later murders.

Since 8 March 1999, Draganer committed three murders of girls with extreme cruelty, inflicting over 50 stab wounds on one of his victims. However, he never raped or robbed his victims, taking only symbolic things (such as jewellery) as trophies. In the summer of 1999, for the first time, one of the victims survived his attacks and gave a description of the criminal to the police, but that didn't help the investigators.

Draganer also killed two young people. His accomplices in these crimes were acquaintances from the vocational school: Pavel Ivannikov, Alexey Kozlov and brothers Alexander and Dmitry Shubin. At first, Draganer proposed killing a fellow student who, according to his friends, "terrorized" them. The student was taken out on a fishing trip, where he was beaten unconscious. He was then tied up, with a piece of iron tied to his foot, and thrown into the Volga River. After some time, the corpse surfaced – in the ACT's reports, he was listed as unidentified.

One day, one of Draganer's friends, Ivan, saw blood-stained clothes on him and asked if he was the Kamyshin Maniac, whom everyone was looking for. In Draganer's own words, Ivan signed his death sentence. Draganer and his accomplices beat him in cold blood and, having tied him up, took Ivan along a dirt road leading to the village of Sestrenka, to plantations near the military unit area. A grave was dug there, into which the victim was thrown and subsequently shot by Draganer. After killing him, the criminals filled up the grave. The friend was soon pronounced missing, with his case photographs provided by relatives ending up on the table of the same investigator who was on the Kamyshing Maniac case.

In late August 1999, the surviving victim accidentally noticed a photograph on the investigator's desk, in which the missing Ivan was in the frame along with his buddy Vladimir Draganer, identifying the latter as the man who had attacked her. He was quickly detained while in the military, in the draft board. Draganer immediately admitted committing all of the crimes and implicated his accomplices, also accusing his mother of instilling a hatred of women in him. He had dreamed of taking revenge since childhood, so he killed his first victim on International Women's Day.

The subsequent forensic psychiatric examination concluded that Draganer was sane, did not suffer from a mental disorder and was clearly aware of his actions. On 18 July 2001, he was given life imprisonment by the Volgograd Regional Court. His accomplices were sentenced to similar long terms of imprisonment.

He was sent to serve his sentence in the Black Dolphin Prison, in Orenburg Oblast.

== See also ==
- List of Russian serial killers
