= Inzer =

Inzer Инзер
- Selo
- Location within Bashkortostan Location within Russia
- Coordinates: 54°12′N 57°33′E
- Country: Russia
- Region: Bashkortostan
- District: Beloretsky District
- Time zone: UTC+5:00

Inzer (Russian: Инзер; Bashkir: Инйәр, İnyär) is a rural locality (a selo) and the administrative centre of Inzersky Selsoviet, Beloretsky District, Bashkortostan, Russia. The population was 4,329 as of 2010. There are 70 streets.

== Geography ==
Inzer is located 90 km northwest of Beloretsk (the district's administrative centre) by road. Usmangali is the nearest rural locality.
