= Nizhnyaya Ivolga =

Nizhnyaya Ivolga Нижняя Иволга
- Selo
- Location within Republic of Buryatia Location within Russia
- Coordinates: 51°46′N 107°25′E
- Country: Russia
- Region: Republic of Buryatia
- District: Ivolginsky District
- Time zone: UTC+8:00

Nizhnyaya Ivolga (Russian: Нижняя Иволга; Buryat: Доодо Ивалга, Doodo Ivalga) is a rural locality (a selo) in Ivolginsky District, Republic of Buryatia, Russia. The population was 1,724 as of 2010. There are 101 streets.

== Geography ==
Nizhnyaya Ivolga is located 11 km northeast of Ivolginsk (the district's administrative centre) by road. Nur-Seleniye is the nearest rural locality.
