= Black Dolphin Prison =

Prison in Russia

Black Dolphin
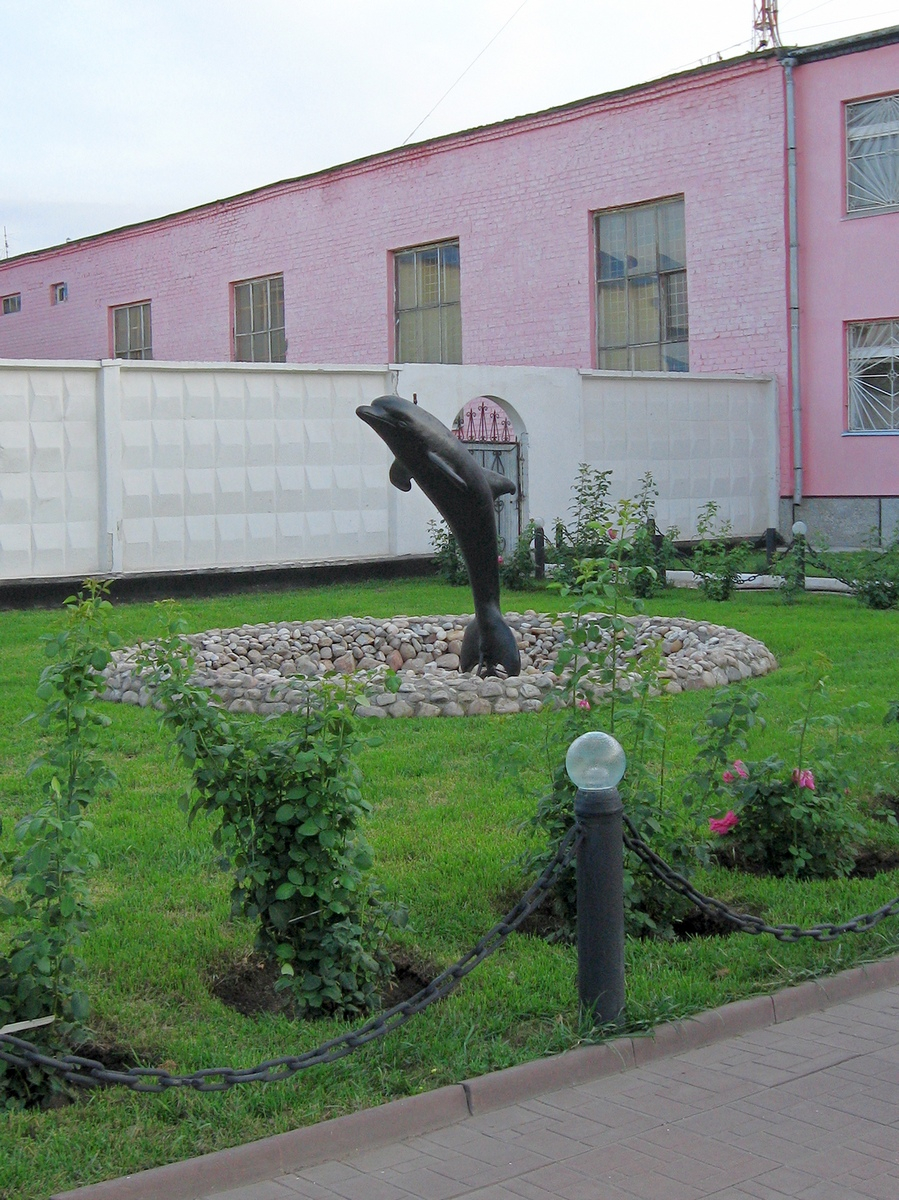

- Location within Orenburg Oblast Location within Russia
- Location: Sol-Iletsk, Orenburg Oblast, Russia; 51°9′20″N 54°59′35″E
- Status: Operational
- Population: ~700
- Opened: circa 1745
- Managed by: Federal Penitentiary Service
- Governor: Colonel Yuri Korobov

Federal Governmental Institution - Penal Colony No. 6 of the Federal Penitentiary Service of Russia in Orenburg Oblast, (Note: Russian: Федеральное казённое учреждение — Исправительная колония №6 Управления Федеральной службы исполнения наказаний России по Оренбургской области, or shortly Russian: ФКУ ИК-6 УФСИН России по Оренбургской области) commonly known as the Black Dolphin Prison (Russian: Чёрный дельфин, romanized: Chyorny delʹfin) and formerly known as NKVD Prison No. 2 is a prison in Sol-Iletsk, Orenburg Oblast, Russia, near its border with Kazakhstan. It is one of the oldest prisons in Russia, and one of the first in the Orenburg Oblast to accept prisoners with life sentences. It gets its unofficial name from a prisoner-constructed sculpture depicting a black dolphin, which is set in front of the main entrance.

Originally, Black Dolphin was a jail (ostrog) for those sentenced to life at hard labor, since at least 1745. After the suppression of Pugachev's Rebellion in 1773, the prison was updated for the deportation and confinement of robbers. The prison houses approximately 700 inmates convicted of grave offenses, including sexual violence against minors, homicide, terrorism, and cannibalism. Prisoners at Black Dolphin are all serving sentences of life imprisonment. The prison began accepting these inmates on November 1st, 2000.

== Conditions ==
Inmates are kept isolated in cells that have a set of three steel doors. For 90 minutes a day, they exercise in a large cage; during this time, cells are searched for contraband or illegal items. Inmates are also under 24-hour surveillance and supervision; they are forced to stand and forbidden from resting or sitting on their bunks from the time they awake until bedtime (roughly 16 hours). When prison officers make a command to the inmates, they’re required to immediately respond with the words "yes sir". Guards make rounds every quarter hour. Prisoners are fed soup four times a day, and are only allowed books, newspapers, and a radio.

While the prison has been accused of beating prisoners with rifles daily as a form of physical torture, routine, daily beatings by guards are not officially confirmed, and the day-to-day reality of the prison is built around breaking inmates through enforced psychological control, rather than random violence. That said, human rights organizations and former inmates have widely documented systemic psychological warfare, isolation, and routine physical abuse across Russia's high-security penal institutions, including at Black Dolphin Prison, and have accused such prisons of basically adopting the old system from the Soviet Gulag era.

Prison guards place blindfolds on arriving inmates so that they cannot map out the prison or plan escapes. Inmates are also blindfolded whenever they are transported between buildings. Black Dolphin prison officers have a unique form of escorting inmates: Prisoners are kept bent over at the waist while a guard holds his handcuffed hands behind his back, higher than his hips. This escort control tactic allows for maximum control while depriving the inmate of a view of his immediate surroundings, accomplishing the dual goals of discouraging him from attempting to attack staff and of escaping.

== Notable inmates ==
=== Current ===
- Said Amirov (born 1954), politician sentenced to life for terrorism and issuing contract killings
- Stanislav Beloruscev (born 1967), serial killer
- Viktor Bolkhovsky (born 1959), serial killer and rapist
- Vladimir Draganer (born 1981), serial killer
- Vadim Ershov (born 1973), serial killer, rapist, and robber
- Farit Gabidullin (born 1972), serial killer and rapist with his brother
- Ramses Gaichayev (born 1976), serial killer, mass-murderer, rapist, robber, and brigand
- Ilnaz Galyaviev (born 2001), mass murderer
- Vadim Krotov (born 1967), serial killer and child molester
- Andrei Melyukh (born 1977), serial killer and robber
- Vladimir Mukhankin (born 1960), serial killer and rapist
- Yakhiya Mursalimov (born 1953), serial killer and robber
- Yevgeny Nagorny (born 1972), serial killer
- Vladimir Nikolayevich Nikolayev (born 1959), murderer and cannibal
- Kegashbek Orunbayev (born 1962), serial killer, rapist, necrophile and cannibal
- Alexey Pichugin (born 1962), former manager in the security department at the Russian oil company Yukos.
- Alexander Pirovskih (born 1958), serial killer and fraudster
- Hafiz Razzakov (born 1975), terrorist and serial killer
- Oleg Rylkov (born 1966), serial killer, rapist, and pedophile
- Sergey Shipilov (born 1959), serial killer and rapist
- Yuri Tsiuman (born 1969), serial killer and rapist

=== Former ===
- Sergey Maduev (1956-2000), serial killer and brigand; died from heart-failure and diabetes complications.
- Alexander Maslich (1972-2015), serial killer who committed four murders while incarcerated at different prisons; died at Black Dolphin from undisclosed causes
- Carola Neher (1900-1942), actress; sentenced to 10 years for Trotskyism; was incarcerated at three different prisons, including Black Dolphin, where she died from typhus
- Tariel Oniani (born 1952), mafia boss and thief in law, was incarcerated at Black Dolphin from 2010 to 2019 after being convicted of kidnapping and then released.
- Mikhail Popkov (born 1964), serial killer, was incarcerated at Black Dolphin from 11 December 2018 until 2020 and then transferred.
- Valery Skoptsov (1951-2004), serial killer, rapist, and thief; died from heart-failure.
- Tsyben Zhamtsarano (1881-1942), Buryat scholar and folklorist.

== See also ==
- Category:Inmates of Black Dolphin Prison
