= Sol-Iletsk =

Town in Orenburg Oblast, Russia

Sol-Iletsk Соль-Илецк
- Town
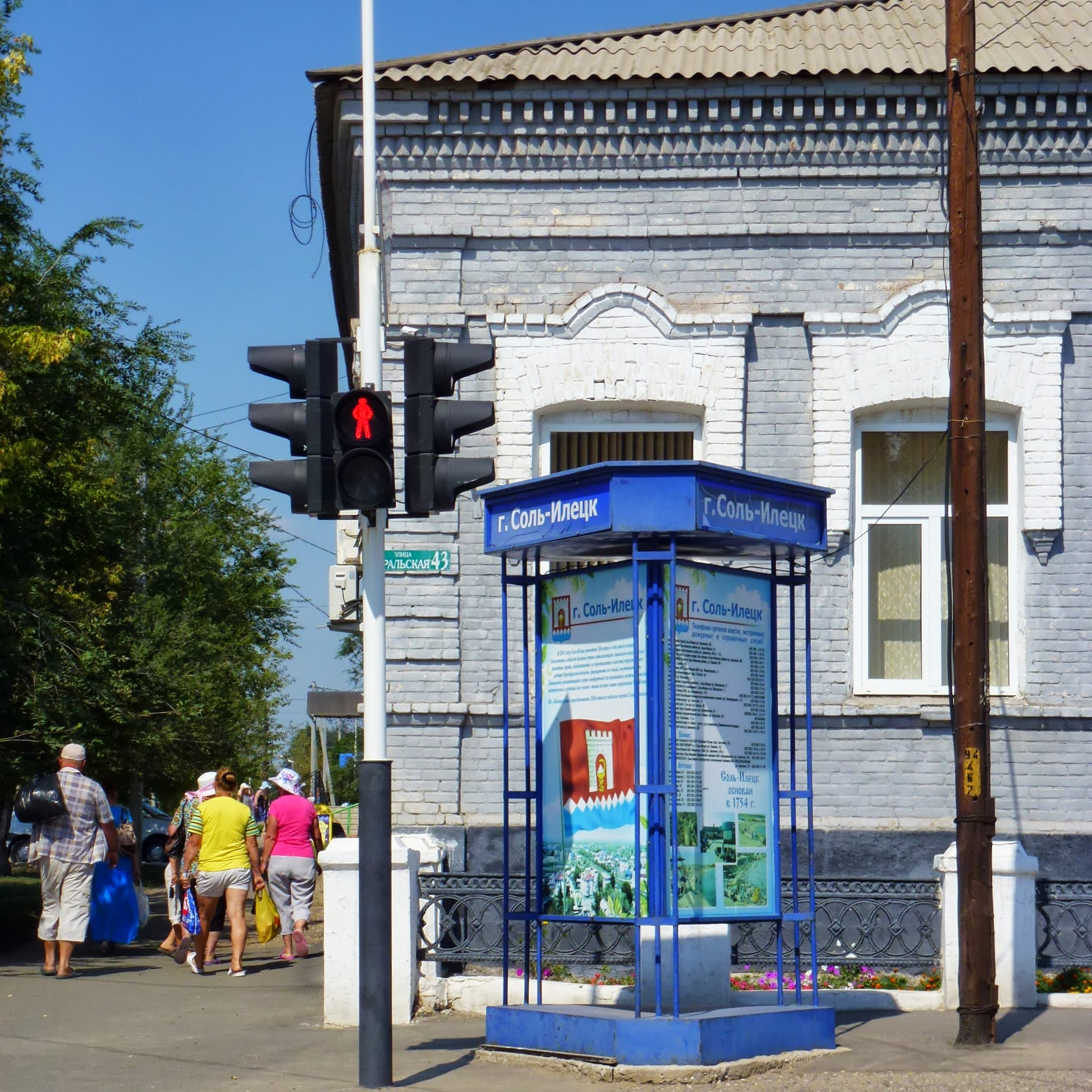

- Flag Coat of arms
- Interactive map of Sol-Iletsk
- Location of Sol-Iletsk Sol-Iletsk (Orenburg Oblast)
- Coordinates: 51°10′N 55°00′E
- Country: Russia
- Federal subject: Orenburg Oblast
- Founded: 17th century
- Elevation: 125 m (410 ft)

Population (2010 Census)
  - Total: 28,377
  - Estimate (2021): 26,149 (−7.9%)

Administrative status
  - Subordinated to: Town of Sol-Iletsk
  - Capital of: Sol-Iletsky District, Town of Sol-Iletsk

Municipal status
  - Urban okrug: Sol-Iletsky Urban Okrug
  - Capital of: Sol-Iletsky Urban Okrug
- Time zone: UTC+5 (MSK+2)
- Postal codes: 461500, 461501, 461503–461505, 461509
- OKTMO ID: 53725000001
- Website: www.soliletsk.com

Sol-Iletsk (Russian: Соль-Иле́цк) is a town in Orenburg Oblast, Russia, located on the right bank of the Ilek River (Ural's tributary), 77 kilometers (48 mi) south of Orenburg, the administrative center of the oblast. Population: 28,377 (2010 census); 26,883 (2002 census); 23,836 (1989 Soviet census); 22,000 (1975); 11,802 (1897).

The climate is arid, sharply continental.

== History ==
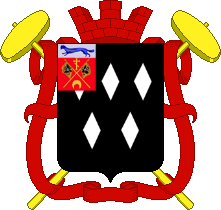
Coat of arms (1865)

It was founded in the 17th century as a Cossack settlement. In the mid-18th century, it was renamed Iletskaya Zashchita (Илецкая защита) due to the construction of fortifications. The name was then changed to Iletsk (Илецк) in the 19th century. In 1945, the town was given its present name. A thick bed of rocksalt is worked near this town (hence, the word "соль" (sol) in the town's name, which means "salt" in Russian). The place has also been known as a balneological resort for its mineral waters, salt, mud, and brine baths, and its kumis cures.

== Administrative and municipal status ==
Within the framework of administrative divisions, Sol-Iletsk serves as the administrative center of Sol-Iletsky District, even though it is not a part of it. As an administrative division, it is incorporated separately as the Town of Sol-Iletsk—an administrative unit with the status equal to that of the districts. As a municipal division, the territories of the Town of Sol-Iletsk and of Sol-Iletsky District are incorporated as Sol-Iletsky Urban Okrug.

== Penitentiary facilities ==
Sol-Iletsk houses what is commonly called the Black Dolphin Prison.
