= List of Soviet and post-Soviet serial killers nicknamed after Andrei Chikatilo =

The following is a list of Soviet and post-Soviet serial killers (Note: In the context of the article, a “Soviet” serial killer refers to one whose crimes took place primarily between the formation of the Soviet Union in 1922 and its dissolution in 1991, and a “post-Soviet” serial killer refers to one whose crimes took place primarily after said dissolution.) nicknamed after Andrei Chikatilo, who sexually assaulted, murdered and mutilated at least 52 women as well as children of both genders between 1978 and his arrest in 1990.

== List ==
=== Soviet ===
Name	Years active	Proven victims	Possible victims	Status	Nickname and general information	Ref
Alexander Skrynnik	1970s–1980	3	3	Deceased; executed by firing squad in 1981	"The Moldavian Chikatilo"; murdered and mutilated three women in Yakutia and Kishinev.	
Nikolay Sakharov	1977	3	3	Deceased; executed by firing squad on 5 February 1979	"The Vologda Chikatilo"; kidnapped, raped, and bludgeoned three young girls in Vologda.	
Konstantin Cheryomushkin	1986–1989	4	4	Deceased; executed by firing squad in 1993	"Chikatilo's Double"; raped, murdered, and mutilated four girls aged 9–14 in Bataysk.	
Sergey Golovkin	1986–1992	11	13+	Deceased; executed by gunshot at Butyrka Prison on 2 August 1996	"Chikatilo's Apprentice"; abducted, tortured, sexually assaulted, murdered, at least 11 young boys aged 8–16 in his garage basement or the forests around Moscow.	
Toregeldy Zharambaev	1990–1992	33	33+	Deceased; executed by gunshot in 1993	"The Shymkent Chikatilo"; murdered at least 33 people in and around Shymkent, Kazakhstan.	

=== Post-Soviet ===
Name	Years active	Proven victims	Possible victims	Status	Nickname and general information	Ref
Nikolai Dudin	1987–2002	13	13	Serving a life sentence at White Swan Prison	"The Furmanov Chikatilo"; murdered his father and twelve other people he deemed to have "humiliated [his] dignity" in Furmanov.	
Vladimir Retunsky	1990–1996	8	12	Free; served a sentence of 15 years at Vladimir Central Prison and was released in 2012	"The Chikatilo of Khopyor River" and "The Voronezh Chikatilo"; raped, murdered, and mutilated between eight and twelve female hitchhikers in his hometown of Povorino.	
Vadim Ershov	1992–1995	19	19	Serving a life sentence at Black Dolphin Prison	"The Krasnoyarsk Chikatilo" (Note: This nickname is shared with another serial killer on this list, Abdufatto Zamanov.); robbed, raped, and murdered 19 young girls and elderly women in and around Krasnoyarsk.	
Alexander Dudnik	1993–1994	3	3	Deceased; executed by gunshot in 1996	"The Akmola Chikatilo"; murdered at least 3 people in and around Vishnevka, Kazakhstan.	
Alexander Polischuk	1993–1994	11	11+	Deceased; sentenced to death but died of pneumonia in 1996	"Kherson Chikatilo"; rapist who murdered at least eleven women and children.	
Roman Burtsev	1993–1996	6	6	Died December 2023 at White Swan Prison	"The Kamensky Chikatilo"; raped and strangled five young girls aged 7–12, also bludgeoning one of the victims' 12-year-old brother, in his hometown of Kamensk-Shakhtinsky.	
Vladimir Mukhankin	1995	9	9	Serving a life sentence at Black Dolphin Prison	"The Pupil of Chikatilo"; murdered and mutilated nine girls and women in and around Shakhty.	
Sergey Shipilov	1995–1999	14	14	Serving a life sentence at Black Dolphin Prison	"The Velsk Chikatilo" and "The Arkhangelsk Chikatilo"; raped and murdered 14 female hitchhikers in and around the town of Velsk, most of them while out on prison leave.	
Vadim Krotov	1997–1999	4	4	Serving a life sentence at Black Dolphin Prison	"The Nakhodka Chikatilo"; lured four teenage girls into his apartment in Nakhodka and raped them on camera after getting them intoxicated on alcohol, strangling them after.	
Alexander Ershov	1997	8	19	Deceased; committed suicide shortly after the decision to undergo compulsory treatment was made. Nikolai Modestov previously mentioned this in his book "Serial Killers."	"The Losinous Maniac" and "Chikatilo of Losin Island".	
Yevgeny Petrov	1998–2003	11	11	Serving a life sentence at the Polar Owl prison colony	The "New Ural Chikatilo"; pedophile and serial killer who confessed to 11 murders.	
Anatoly Sedykh	1998–2003	12	12	Deceased; committed suicide at the Black Berkut prison colony on 11 June 2023	"The Lipetsk Chikatilo"; raped and murdered 12 young women in Lipetsk, robbing the corpses afterwards.	
Yevgeny Chuplinsky	1998–2005	19	29	Serving a life sentence at the Snezhinka labor colony	"The Siberian Chikatilo"; murdered and mutilated between 19 and 29 prostitutes in and around Novosibirsk.	
Sergey Chyorny	1999	10	11	Deceased; died of pneumonia in a psychiatric hospital on 24 June 2001	"The Smolensk Chikatilo"; strangled ten or 11 women in Smolensk.	
Nikolai Litvin	1999	10	10+	Sentenced to compulsory treatment	"The Prokopyevsk Chikatilo"; raped and strangled at least ten girls and young women.	
Alexander Lobanov	1999–2001	5	5	Deceased; committed suicide by hanging at SIZO-1 prison on 6 March 2002	"The Perm Chikatilo" (Note: This nickname is shared with another serial killer on this list, Dmitry Tambasov.); raped and murdered five women in Perm.	
Levan Haroyan	2000–2002	6	20+	Sentenced to compulsory treatment	"The Krasnodar Chikatilo"; schizophrenic man who raped, robbed, and murdered female hitchhikers.	
Valery Kopytov	2000–2004	19	19	Serving a prison sentence of 25 years	"The Barnaul Chikatilo"; homeless man who killed 19 other homeless people in Altai Krai, either as a result of arguments or in order to rob them.	
Yuri Gritsenko	2001	5	5	Serving a prison sentence of 22 years	"The Zelenograd Chikatilo"; bludgeoned five women in his hometown shortly after being released from prison for a previous murder committed at an unknown date.	
Dmitry Tambasov	2001–2002	3	11+	Serving a prison sentence of 25 years	"The Perm Chikatilo" (Note: This nickname is shared with another serial killer on this list, Alexander Lobanov.); convicted of raping and murdering three women; suspected of killing a total of 11.	
Oleg Zaikin	2001–2006	9	9+	Deceased; committed suicide by hanging at SIZO No. 1 on 20 November 2006	"The Urals Chikatilo"; raped and murdered at least nine women and children in several regions across Russia.	
Abdufatto Zamanov	2002–2004	14	14	Serving a life sentence at the Polar Owl prison colony	"The Krasnoyarsk Chikatilo" (Note: This nickname is shared with another serial killer on this list, Vadim Ershov.); murdered 14 people out of rage in Krasnoyarsk.	
Vladimir Zhukov	2002–2006	3	4	Serving a life sentence at White Swan Prison	"The Nizhegorodsky Chikatilo" and "The New Chikatilo"; abducted, raped and murdered three or four children in Nizhny Novgorod.	
Artur Shayakhmetov	2002–2010	9	9	Serving a life sentence in prison	"The Astrakhan Chikatilo"; robbed and murdered nine people in Astrakhan.	
Alexey Falkin	2004–2017	4	4	Serving a life sentence in prison	"The Ural Chikatilo"; raped and murdered women in and around Yekaterinburg.	
Oleg Chizhov	2006–2007	4	4	Serving a prison sentence of 22.5 years	"The Birsky Chikatilo"; brutally raped and murdered women in and around Birsk.	
Vladimir Tushinsky	2010–2014	5	5	Deceased; died of cardiac arrest on 5 August 2016	"The Kamchatka Chikatilo"; raped and murdered girls and young women in Kamchatka Krai.	
Andrey Yezhov	2010–2020	7	7+	Deceased; committed suicide by hanging on 6 July 2020	"The Podmoskovsky Chikatilo"; sexually assaulted and murdered (or murdered and then raped) young girls and elderly women in Moscow.	
Murad Nurmagomedov	2013–2016 (confirmed); 2004–2016 (suspected)	4	5	Serving a sentence of 18 years at a prison labor colony	"The Kaspiysk Chikatilo"; a drug trafficker who murdered acquaintances at his house in Kaspiysk.	
Bakhtiyor Matyakubov	2015	10	10+	Serving a life sentence in prison	"The Uzbek Chikatilo" raped and murdered middle-aged women across Russia, Ukraine, and Uzbekistan.	
