= Churilov =

Churilov (Russian: Чурилов or Ukrainian: Чурілов) is a Russian and Ukrainian surname. The feminine version of it is Churilova (Russian: Чурилова). Notable people with this surname include:

== Churilov ==
- Gennady Churilov (1987–2011), Russian ice hockey player
- Oleksandr Churilov (born 1984), Ukrainian football goalkeeper
- Yevgeny Churilov, a child murdered in 1993 by Russian serial killer Roman Burtsev

- Olesya Churilova, sister of the above

== Churilova ==
- Irina Churilova, Russian soprano singer
- Liana Churilova (born 1991), Russian-American ballroom dancer
- L. A. Churilova, a.k.a. Lidia Charskaya (1875–1938), Russian writer and actress
