= Dudnik =

Dudnik or Dudnyk (Russian: Дудник) is a gender-neutral Slavic surname. Notable people with the surname include:

- Alexander Dudnik (1939–1996), Kazakhstani serial killer
- Andrei Dudnik (born 1981), Russian football player
- Ihor Dudnyk (born 1985), Ukrainian football defender
- Olesya Dudnik (born 1974), Ukrainian gymnastics coach and former artistic gymnast
- Yelena Dudnik (born 1978), Russian sport shooter
- Yuriy Dudnyk (born 1968), Ukrainian football coach and a former player
- Yurii Dudnyk (footballer, born 2002), Ukrainian football player
