= Arshaly =

Arshaly may refer to:

- Arshaly (river)
- Arshaly (Akmola Region)
- Arshaly District, Akmola Region
