= Alexander Dudnik =

Kazakhstani serial killer (1939–1996)

- Born: Alexander Grigorievich Dudnik; 6 August 1939; Tselinograd, Kazakh SSR
- Died: 5 April 1996 (aged 56); SIZO-1, Akmola, Kazakhstan
- Cause of death: Execution by shooting
- Other names: The Akmola Chikatilo; One-Legged Maniac; Maniac from Vishnevka; One-Legged Grandfather
- Conviction: Murder x3
- Penalty: Death

Details
- Victims: 3
- Span of crimes: 1993–1994
- Country: Kazakhstan
- State: Akmola Region
- Date apprehended: 10 June 1994

Alexander Grigorievich Dudnik (Kazakh: Александр Григорьевич Дудник; Russian: Александр Григорьевич Дудник; 6 August 1939 – 5 April 1996) was a Kazakhstani serial killer and rapist who murdered at least 3 women in and around Vishnevka between 1993 and 1994. Before committing a series of murders, Dudnik had been convicted of rape three times during the Soviet era. In 1995, he was sentenced to death, which was carried out in April 1996. Dudnik had a distinctive feature - his left leg was amputated above the knee. He was known by the nicknames the "Akmola Chikatilo", "One-Legged Maniac", "Maniac from Vishnevka" and "One-Legged Grandfather".

== Early life and criminal career ==
Alexander Grigorievich Dudnik was born on 6 August 1939, in Tselinograd (present-day Astana) to a family of special settlers, a special category of repressed population in the Soviet Union. He was the eldest child in a family of five. He spent his childhood and adolescence in a socially disadvantaged environment. During his school years, Dudnik showed no interest in studying and spent much of his free time on the streets, which, as a social and educational environment, greatly influenced the formation of his personality. At that time, Tselinograd was home to many declassed elements of society and was plagued by crime. Since most of Dudnik's acquaintances led marginal lifestyles, he fell under their influence in his teenage years and soon began a criminal career.

In the mid-1950s, Dudnik and his accomplices were arrested for theft. He was convicted and sentenced to three years in prison. After serving his sentence, he was released in 1959. After his release, Dudnik began to exhibit a pathologically heightened sexual attraction to women. He committed several sexual assaults on women, after which he was arrested in 1961 on charges of rape. In February 1962, he was convicted and sentenced to four years in prison. Released in 1966, Dudnik soon began assaulting women again, sexually harassing them. The court found him guilty of rape and sentenced him to seven years in prison.

Having served his sentence in full, Dudnik was released again in 1973. He returned to Tselinograd, where, several months after his release, he again raped a girl. At the trial, the court found the evidence of his guilt overwhelming and, based on Dudnik's history as a repeat rapist, sentenced him to death by firing squad on 27 May 1974. Following the trial, Dudnik filed a cassation appeal, which was upheld. The Supreme Court of the Soviet Union, having reviewed the criminal case materials, found a number of procedural errors and, on 6 April 1976, issued a ruling commuting Dudnik's death sentence to 15 years' imprisonment.

While serving his sentence in a penal colony, Dudnik was characterized extremely negatively by the prison administration. In the early 1980s, he, along with other convicts, attempted to escape.by digging a tunnel, but the escape failed, and Dudnik and his accomplices were detained. He appeared in court again and subsequently received an additional 3 years in prison. After serving 18 years, Dudnik was released in 1991, shortly before the dissolution of the Soviet Union. He found housing in the village of Vishnevka (Akmola Region) and soon began living with a local woman. In 1992, due to complications from diabetes and damage to the vascular bed, Dudnik's left leg was amputated above the knee during treatment. He was assigned a 1st group disability and a pension, but Dudnik quickly adapted to his physical condition.

Dudnik purchased an IZH Jupiter-5 motorcycle for the purpose of traveling and thus continued to lead a socially active lifestyle. During this period, friends, acquaintances and relatives characterized him extremely positively.

== Murders ==
Between September 1993 and June 1994, Dudnik murdered three women, accompanied by rape. In all cases, he demonstrated his characteristic modus operandi. Dudnik chose girls and women as his victims, offering them a ride. Since there was no regular transportation between the villages of the Vishnevsky District at the time and residents often traveled on foot, Dudnik's victims readily agreed to his offer and voluntarily climbed into the sidecar of his motorcycle. Under various pretexts, he took them to a deserted area, where, under threat of physical violence, he raped them, after which he killed them by strangulation or stab wounds. To conceal evidence, he doused the corpses of the murdered with flammable liquid and attempted to burn them.

Dudnik committed his first murder on 18 September 1993. His victim was 22-year-old Natalia Muzychenko, whom he encountered during the day on the road near the village of Rodniki (Vishnevsky District, Akmola Region). The girl was on her way to Vishnevka to help her mother dig potatoes. She accepted Dudnik's offer to give her a ride, after which he drove her toward a nearby forest plantation, where he raped and strangled her with his hands. Her remains were discovered only a month later, in mid-October of that year.

The second murder took place on 18 October 1993, near the village of Akbulak (Vishnevsky District). The victim was Kulken Kerimova, a kindergarten director and mother of many children. Following the same pattern, Dudnik offered the woman a ride, which she accepted. He drove her to a secluded area, where he attempted to rape her, but was unable to do so for physical reasons. He then strangled Kerimova with her own headscarf and set her body on fire, having first doused her with diesel fuel.

Dudnik committed his last murder on 6 June 1994, near the village of Akbulak. The victim was Svetlana Bastova, whom he offered a ride on his motorcycle, after which he drove her to a forested area, where he raped and stabbed her to death, stabbing her in the chest.

== Trial, sentence, and execution ==
After Bastova's murder, her husband reported her missing to the police. During a search, law enforcement officers discovered Bastova's body on 9 June of that year near a railroad track. During the investigation, police contacted local media outlets, who, at their request, published an article in their newspapers about the discovery of Bastova's body and called on local residents who might have seen her on the day of her disappearance to contact the police. A witness, the driver of a state farm vehicle, was soon found. He told investigators that on the day of Bastova's disappearance, he had seen an elderly man on crutches, missing his left leg, at the location where the woman was found. Since Dudnik matched the description of the suspect, he was arrested on 10 June 1994.

During his first interrogation, Dudnik confessed to three murders and expressed a willingness to cooperate with the investigation. The next day, he was escorted to the murder scenes to participate in investigative experiments. In addition to Dudnik's confessions, evidence of his involvement in the murders included items belonging to the victims, which he took from them as trophies and hid in his home or the homes of some of his relatives. For example, Dudnik told investigators the location of the purse of his first victim, Natalya Muzychenko, which contained the key to the front door of her apartment. The belongings of the victims were discovered during a search of Dudnik's home and were subsequently identified by the relatives of the murdered women as belonging to them.

During interrogation, Dudnik claimed that he had no problem meeting women and gaining their trust, as, due to his asthenic build and disability, no one in the area considered him a socially dangerous person. In 1995, Dudnik was found guilty of three murders at trial and sentenced to death by firing squad for the second time. In late 1995, he submitted a petition for clemency to the President of Kazakhstan, but it remained unanswered. On 5 April 1996, Dudnik was executed by firing squad.

== In popular culture ==
- The episode "One-Legged Grandfather" from the series 5:32 is based on the case of Alexander Dudnik (2021).

== See also ==
- List of serial killers by country
- List of serial killers by number of victims
- List of Soviet and post-Soviet serial killers nicknamed after Andrei Chikatilo
