= Tushinsky =

Tushinsky (Russian: Ту́шинский) is a Russian surname. Notable people with the surname include:

- Joseph Tushinsky (1910–1988), American electronics pioneer
- Vladimir Tushinsky (1976–2016), Russian serial killer
