= Alexander Gerashchenko =

Russian serial killer (born 1971)

- Born: Alexander Viktorovich Gerashchenko; 5 January 1971 (age 55); Solikamsk, Perm Krai, RSFSR
- Other names: "The Solikamsk Shooter" "The Perm Beast"
- Conviction: Murder
- Penalty: Life imprisonment

Details
- Victims: 7
- Span of crimes: 1998–2005
- Country: Russia
- State: Perm
- Date apprehended: 19 March 2008

Alexander Viktorovich Gerashchenko (Russian: Алекса́ндр Ви́кторович Гера́щенко; born 5 January 1971), known as The Solikamsk Shooter (Russian: Соликамский стрелок), is a Russian serial killer who committed murders to obtain the weapons of the victims.

== Life before the murders ==
Gerashchenko served in the special unit of the Marine Corps, and was given the military specialty of "diver scout". After demobilization, Gerashchenko got a job as a firefighter, and by 2006 was an assistant to the chief of the 16th fire station. Gerashchenko did not drink alcohol, coffee or tea, did not smoke, eat meat or use a mobile phone, but did do sports, read classical literature and teach foreign languages. By his own admission, he dreamed of permanently settling in Spain.

== Murders ==
The first murder committed was on 13 July 1998, when Gerashchenko killed a conscripted soldier guarding the "Ural" plant. He shot him with a small rifle, hitting him in the head. Gerashchenko stole an AK-47 with a spare magazine.

Soon afterwards Gerashchenko made an attempt to attack the Interdistrict Department of private security at the Office of Internal Affairs of Solikamsk. But he was found in time hiding in some bushes, where he was ambushed. However, he managed to flee and fell off the radar for two years.

The next victims were a security guard of the Universal City Base, killed in 2000, and another security officer of the Solikamsk Magnesium Plant OJSC, who was killed on the night of 5 to 6 August 2001. Both of them were killed by single shots through the windows. After committing the last murder, Gerashchenko tried to enter the territory of the magnesium plant, but an employee opened fire on him and he was fled.

In the summer of 2003, Gerashchenko attacked the "Ural" plant again. He shot an employee, took away his service weapon (a Nagant M1895 revolver with 7 cartridges), and disappeared into the forest.

On 19 September 2004, he made a third attack on the "Ural" plant. His fifth victim was an employee who had fallen asleep in the plant's factory building. Gerashchenko stole her Nagant M1895 revolver, its holster and six rounds.

On the afternoon of 7 June 2005, Gerashchenko shot a senior sergeant of the militia from the sub-department security unit with an assault rifle, and stole his Makarov service pistol with a full magazine. The badly wounded policeman was found by passers-by and an ambulance was called, but the doctors could not save him.

The seventh victim was a young woman whom he killed in December 2005 in front of her 4-year-old daughter. As it later turned out, he had undivided feelings for her. Passers-by chased him, but he managed to escape. On the way, he threw off his outer clothing and mask, and disappeared after the incident.

On the night of 25 to 26 December 2006, Gerashchenko tried to enter a store. Vigilant citizens called the militsiya, and two officers soon arrived. When they entered the store, Gerashchenko opened fire on them, wounding one of the policemen. As it later turned out, Gerashchenko made an attempt to break into the store in order to entice the police, but could not steal a weapon, as he was overwhelmed during the shootout, and had to surrender.

== Arrest, trial and sentence ==
The trails left behind were purely coincidental. A fire once broke out in Solikamsk, and after it was extinguished, an AK-47 and pieces of a fireman's belt were discovered. On the site of the last murder, Gerashchenko had lost a LED light. The seller in a Salikamsk store, in which such lights were sold, said that they had been supplied by his acting fireman, who, in turn, claimed that he received them from Gerashchenko.

Gerashchenko, sensing the increased interest of law enforcement agencies, decided to flee abroad. He wrote a report on his dismissal from the service but failed to deceive the militiamen, and was detained on the outskirts of Solikamsk. During the search, false documents, money, weapons, and maps of European countries were found in Gerashchenko's possession. He acted calmly, immediately agreeing to cooperate with the investigation. Gerashchenko revealed all the weapons caches and confessed to committing seven murders in eight years. He explained his motives by saying "I was not going to sell weapons, I had no personal advantage"... Relatives and colleagues of Gerashchenko were very surprised that he was the "Solikamsk Shooter". The case was considered for several months in the Perm Regional Court. On 7 November 2008, the court sentenced Gerashchenko to life imprisonment with serving a sentence in a special regime colony. The Supreme Court of Russia upheld the verdict without change. Currently, Alexander Gerashchenko is serving his sentence in the White Swan prison.

== See also ==
- List of Russian serial killers
