= Mikhail Ustinovich =

Russian robber and serial killer

- Born: Mikhail Ivanovich Ustinovich; 12 March 1958 (age 68); Komsomolskoye, Tyumen Oblast, RSFSR
- Other name: "Blind Mouse"
- Conviction: Murder
- Penalty: Death; commuted to life imprisonment

Details
- Victims: 4
- Span of crimes: 1992–1993
- Country: Russia
- State: Moscow
- Date apprehended: 1993
- Imprisoned at: White Swan Prison, Solikamsk, Perm Krai

Mikhail Ivanovich Ustinovich (Russian: Михаил Иванович Устино́вич; born 12 March 1958) is a Russian criminal. An infamous thief during the early 1990s, he attacked shops, apartments and currency exchange points.

== Childhood and personal life ==
Ustinovich was born on 12 March 1958, inside a prison colony in Komsomolskoye village, Tyumen Oblast, where his mother was serving a sentence. He lived there up to 2 years of age, when he was sent to a boarding school. In a fight with other juvenile delinquents, he was seriously injured on the head, as a result of which Ustinovich's sight deteriorated significantly. In the colony, he earned the nickname "Blind Mouse". He had convictions for thefts and robberies.

In total, at the time of his final arrest at 35 years of age, Mikhail had spent a total of 22 years behind bars.

== Career ==
In 1992, Ustinovich was freed from the colony into a different country, where the fate of the cities was decided by criminal groups. Initially, he robbed Muscovites in elevators.

Ustinovich created a gang consisting of Nikolai Grysko, Armen Sargsyan and Artsrun Karyan. At the end of 1993, the gang began to carry out armed attacks on the "Light" line of stores, which sold lighting equipment. The reward for the gang each time was 7 million rubles. From August to November 1993, they robbed five "Svet" stores, hitting one store twice. During the second raid, Ustinovich planted a newspaper with a note from the first one. The gang's calling card was a shot at the ceiling with a TT pistol.

While robbing, Ustinovich did not hide his face; instead, he and the others did everything possible to be remembered. The investigating team at first took Ustinovich for Valery Volovik, who was also wanted for robberies and murders. While serving a sentence in 1989, Ustinovich met Volovik and was struck by how similar he looked. From then on, when he committed crimes, he disguised himself as Volovik.

Soon, the gang began robbing currency exchange points, and Ustinovich, during one of the robberies, committed a double murder. The victims were two security guards of the Lubyansky shopping center, who tried to stop the bandits. Mikhail lost his hat, which played an important role in his ultimate capture.

In 1993, Moscow was frightened by the exploits of a man dressed as an officer, who robbed apartments and sometimes killed the owners, later discovered to be the work of Ustinovich.

== Arrest, investigation and trial ==
Ustinovich and Grysko were detained while trying to fence valuables to a pawnbroker. Almost immediately, they confessed to the crimes, also implicating Sargsyan and Karyan.

The hat lost by Ustinovich in the Lubyansky shopping centre served as some of the strongest evidence of his guilt. In total, Ustinovich and his gang were found responsible for 21 robberies, a number of thefts and 4 murders.

On 23 August 1996, the Moscow City Court sentenced Ustinovich to an exceptional measure of punishment - the death penalty, which was subsequently replaced with life imprisonment. His accomplices also received sentences: Grysko got 14 years, Sargsyan 10 years, and Karyan 6 years.

Ustinovich is serving his sentence in the White Swan colony. In an interview, he stated that he preferred the death penalty because prison is worse than any death.

== In popular culture ==
- Criminal Russia, The Furious Raider series (1998)
- Documentary film by Vakhtang Mikeladze "Handwriting of the Blind" from the series Documentary Detective (2000).
- Documentary film by Vakhtang Mikeladze "The Bright Strip of Mikhail Ustinovich" from the series Sentenced to life (2008).
- Documentary film by Vakhtang Mikeladze "The crafty philosophy of a killer." from the series Detective stories (2006–2009)
- Documentary film by Vakhtang Mikeladze "Born in Captivity" from the series Life Sentences (2009–2010)

== See also ==
- List of Russian serial killers
