= Gennady Serebrennikov =

Russian serial killer (born 1958)

- Born: Gennady Grigorievich Serebrennikov; 3 April 1958 (age 68); Omsk, Omsk Oblast, RSFSR
- Other name: "The Cleaner"
- Conviction: Murder
- Penalty: Life imprisonment

Details
- Victims: 5
- Span of crimes: 2000–2003
- Country: Russia
- State: Omsk
- Date apprehended: 2003
- Imprisoned at: White Swan Prison, Solikamsk, Perm Krai

Gennady Grigorievich Serebrennikov (Russian: Геннадий Григорьевич Серебренников; born 3 April 1958) is a Russian serial killer and former major of the Ministry of Internal Affairs, who killed 5 witnesses related to his son's 2003 trial.

== Biography ==
In 1981, Serebrennikov entered the Yelabuga Special Secondary Police School of the MVD, from which he graduated with honours in 1983. By decision of the State Qualification Commission, on 29 August 1983, he was officially qualified as a jurist.

Serebrennikov worked for twenty years at the District Department of Internal Affairs in the city of Omsk, after which he retired with the rank of major. According to the recollections of people who knew him, he was ready to do anything in order to maintain the authority entrusted to him. The supervision contingent hated, and was afraid of him, as a result.

Serebrennikov was married and had two sons - Grigori and Viktor, who both had trouble with the law. Even though his father served with the police, Grigori was allegedly involved in brigandage, but when the search warrant disappeared from the prosecutor's office, he was released. His other son, Viktor, was a drug addict. Once, Gennady and Grigori Serebrennikov caught the two drug dealers who sold heroin to Viktor and dragged them to the bathhouse, where they brutally beat and even raped them, filming everything on a camera. The victims did not report this incident to the police.

== Grigori's crimes ==
On 26 October 2000, Grigori Serebrennikov, along with three accomplices - the Chikirevs and Sergei Okoneshnikov - burst into the apartment of entrepreneur Marina Matantseva and tied up her underage son, who was at home. They forced him to show where the money was, and then promptly left. After a hot pursuit, only two of the criminals were captured - Alexander Chikirev and his father. They did not give up their accomplices and were convicted.

In 2001, in a state of intoxication, Serebrennikov severely beat up his relative, as a result of which she died. His wife, Margarita Nikiforova, witnessed the murder. She later testified against him to the police, but Serebrennikov again managed to escape.

Sometime later, at the Khimik gardening partnership, Serebrennikov fought with his drinking buddies, as a result of which one of them died. Serebrennikov was detained, and his other drinking companion, Vladimir Burim, testified against him.

== Gennady's murders ==
In order to save his son, Gennady Serebrennikov decided to get rid of all the witnesses against him. His first victim was Sergei Okoneshnikov, who, after fleeing from Matantseva's apartment, was deceived into a cottage and killed with a sawed-off shotgun. Serebrennikov buried the body in the garden and later told his son about the murder.

He then forced his son Grigori, who was hiding from the authorities, to kill his wife. During a walk, Grigori shot her, then, together with his father, chopped off her head with a shovel and buried the body in the ground. As it later turned out, Gennady initially wanted to entrust the murder of Nikiforova to a certain Denis Latyshev, but he refused, as a result of which the former police major shot him, before finishing him off with a shiv.

In the summer of 2003, Alexander Chikirev was released on parole earlier than supposed to, because he agreed to assist the investigation and testify against the still-wanted Okoneshnikov. At the time, Grigori Serebrennikov had already been arrested, and Gennady tried to persuade Chikirev not to testify, but to no avail. As a result, on the night of 13–14 July 2003, Gennady Serebrennikov snuck into the private house where Chikirev and his pregnant fiancée Anna Kiseleva were sleeping. He calmly shot both of them, then set the house on fire and fled.

Serebrennikov's last victim was the eyewitness to the fight at the Khimik partnership - Vladimir Burim. Like the previous victim, Serebrennikov unsuccessfully tried to persuade him not to testify. He then gave Burim vodka, got him drunk, dragged him on the street and then stabbed him to death with a knife, simulating a robbery-oriented murder.

== Arrest, investigation and trial ==
Two circumstances led to the discovery and capture of Gennady Serebrennikov - the fact that he talked about his crimes to his son Viktor and that he forced Grigori to kill his wife. At one of the interrogations, Grigori, when interrogated about his wife, burst into tears and admitted everything. Viktor, who was detained for drug possession, also revealed what his father had told him. Gennady himself, however, denied everything during the investigation and subsequent trial.

The Omsk Oblast Court sentenced Gennady Serebrennikov to life imprisonment in a corrective labour colony, while his son Grigori received 15 years. The Supreme Court of Russia upheld the verdict, and currently, Serebrennikov is serving his sentence in the White Swan prison, in Perm Krai.

== See also ==
- List of Russian serial killers
