= Denis Pischikov =

Russian serial killer (born 1983)

- Born: Denis Sergeevich Pischikov; 12 April 1983 (age 43); Bulanash, Sverdlovsk Oblast, RSFSR
- Other names: "The Shivering Creature" "Urals Raskolnikov"
- Conviction: Murder
- Penalty: Life imprisonment

Details
- Victims: 14–17
- Span of crimes: 2002–2003
- Country: Russia
- States: Moscow, Vladimir
- Date apprehended: 5 April 2003
- Imprisoned at: White Swan, Solikamsk, Perm Krai

Denis Sergeevich Pischikov (Russian: Дени́с Серге́евич Пи́счиков; born 12 April 1983), known as The Shivering Creature (Russian: Тварь дрожащая), is a Russian robber and serial killer, who killed 14 elderly people between 2002 and 2003 in the Moscow Oblast and Vladimir Oblast.

== Biography ==
Pischikov was born on 12 April 1983, in a loving family in the settlement of Bulanash, Sverdlovsk Oblast, but was born with a congenital disease. His childhood was happy, but after the collapse of the USSR his father was left without work and soon died. All of the family's worries fell upon the shoulders of the mother, Lyuba Ivanovna, who worked at the Artyomovsk radio plant and did not notice how her son was straying from the right path. Soon she married Alexander Anushin, an electric locomotive driver, but he turned out to be an alcoholic who did not even try to establish relationships with the child. Pischikov left school after the 5th grade, repeatedly running into the police for theft and hooliganism. Outwardly, he appeared to be a modest and shy boy.

Pischikov came to Moscow in June 2000. A year later, he was arrested for attempting to steal the radio from a car. However, the mask of a modest fellow helped him, and he, having signed a written undertaking not to leave, disappeared. He was declared wanted on the federal list but was not sought after seriously. Pischikov at first settled in the Vladimir Oblast with his friend, but soon after, he met a girl, with whom he began to live. At first, he worked on the construction of country houses, then at a tyre store, but did not stay there for a long time. Subsequently, he deceived his partner that he worked, bringing home the money that he took from the homes of the retirees he killed.

The first murder carried out by Pischikov occurred on 29 March 2002, in the village of Pashnevo, in the Orekhovo-Zuyevsky District. He stole 3000 rubles from the house of the murdered pensioner Lebedev. The next murder occurred on 8 November 2002, in the village of Potochino, Moscow Oblast, but this time he had a smaller bounty of 700 rubles. He killed the next victim on 17 January 2003, but could not steal any money, since he did not find any in the house.

In a number of cases, Pischikov also took food from the refrigerator of the pensioners he killed, sometimes even while at the crime scenes. On 18 March 2003, Pischikov committed two consecutive murders in the village of Gubin in the Orekhovo-Zuevsky District, stealing 950 rubles and a piece of sausage. On 31 March of the same year, Pischikov committed two more murders in the village of Korovino, again in the Orekhovo-Zuevsky District, stealing a total of 1120 rubles from both murders. This suggested that Pischikov was not robbing - he was killing instead. On 3 April 2003, Pischikov committed his last murder in the village of Voinova Gora, killing a pensioner and his 50-year-old daughter. However, the daughter miraculously survived.

Pischikov was arrested in the city of Likino-Dulyovo. When he was walking along the street and looking for another place to burglarize, he was noticed by a pensioner. He called the police and, at his own risk, began to pursue the perpetrator. Soon, Pischikov was arrested on a deserted street. He began to give evidence on the way to the police station, confessing to all the murders. He however did not repent to the questioners, and according to the investigators' stories: "Pischikov did not even understand what else they wanted from him, except his cooperation with the investigation".

In July 2004, the court sentenced Denis Pischikov to life imprisonment. In a petition for clemency, he wrote: "Have pity on me! Anything but life!". The Supreme Court of Russia upheld the verdict without change, after which Pischikov was sent to the White Swan prison.

=== New confessions ===
In 2025, Pischikov confessed to three additional murders: a double murder in Alexandrov committed on 4 April 2002, and the murder of a pensioner in Kirzhach in August of that year. If convicted, this would raise his total victim count to 17.

== See also ==
- List of Russian serial killers
