= Dmitry Karimov =

Russian rapist and serial killer (born 1978)

- Born: Dmitry Sharifyanovich Karimov; 23 October 1978 (age 48); RSFSR
- Other names: "The Concrete Products Maniac" "The Yekaterinburg Maniac"
- Conviction: Murder
- Penalty: Life imprisonment

Details
- Victims: 7
- Span of crimes: 2005–2006
- Country: Russia
- State: Sverdlovsk
- Date apprehended: 22 March 2006

Dmitry Sharifyanovich Karimov (Russian: Дми́трий Шарифья́нович Кари́мов; born 23 October 1978), known as The Concrete Products Maniac (Russian: Маньяк с ЖБИ), is a Russian serial rapist and serial killer, who raped 10 women from 2005 to 2006, killing 7 of them.

== Biography ==
Little about his early life is known. Karimov was working as a bricklayer in Yekaterinburg when he committed his first offence in 2004. He attacked his girlfriend, punching her several times, then raped and strangled her with a rope. When she lost consciousness, Karimov, thinking he had killed her, took her cell phone and threw the body under a heater. The girl appealed to the police after she woke up, but did not report the rape and attempted murder, explaining that "she just got a job, and did not need any problems with the police". Karimov was convicted of robbery and infliction of bodily injuries, and was sentenced to two years imprisonment.

The first murder he committed was in December 2005, on the territory of the Yekaterinburg Mayanovskoye Central Park of Culture. He killed a 15-year-old schoolgirl, who had just left school and was walking around the park. After killing her, Karimov took her cell phone, 700 rubles and a gold chain, as well as her ID, which he subsequently burned.

All subsequent murders Karimov committed were during the next three months. After getting acquainted with future victims, Karimov introduced himself as a tourist who asked them to show him the sights around Yekaterinburg or posed as a policeman who asked them to go with him to the police station. Sometimes he attacked without warning and thus had no consistent modus operandi. In some cases, he would stab his victims with knives (one of them had been stabbed 20 times), and in others, he strangled them with his bare hands or with a rope. All six subsequent murders were committed in the area of the concrete products plant, from which he earned his nickname.

In March 2006, Karimov attacked two girls in the area of the concrete products factory. Despite the knife injuries, they managed to escape, and later identified Karimov, who was arrested on 22 March 2006. During the investigation, Karimov denied the rapes, claiming that his victims offered to have sex with him. He calmly admitted to the murders, however, and showed the crime scenes to the investigators. As a result, he confessed to seven murders and three attempted murders.

The forensic psychiatric examination diagnosed Karimov as having a "mixed-mosaic personality disorder", and, as a result, was mentally unbalanced. Despite this, he was declared sane. At the trial, Karimov did not deny any charge, kept his head bowed and never made eye contact with his victims' relatives. On 15 March 2007, Dmitry Karimov was sentenced to life imprisonment. He was also ordered to pay 500,000 rubles to the victims' families, and 50,000 rubles to the victims of the attempted murders. The Supreme Court of Russia left the verdict unchanged, and is currently being enforced. Karimov is currently serving his sentence in the White Swan prison.

== See also ==
- List of Russian serial killers
