= Sergey Lozovoi =

Russian serial killer

- Born: Sergey Valerievich Lozovoi; May 1, 1965 (age 61); Novocherkassk, Rostov Oblast, RSFSR
- Other name: "The Giant"
- Conviction: Murder
- Penalty: Life imprisonment

Details
- Victims: 6+
- Span of crimes: July – October 2002
- Country: Russia
- States: Rostov, Krasnodar
- Date apprehended: October 17, 2008

Sergey Valerievich Lozovoi (Russian: Сергей Валерьевич Лозово́й; born May 1, 1965), known as The Giant (Russian: Великан), is a Russian criminal and serial killer who committed a series of brutal murders, for which he was wanted as a fugitive for a long time.

== Biography ==
Lozovoi was born in Novocherkassk, and was notable for his huge and powerful physique. Before the murders, he was convicted for robberies and brigandage a total of three times. On July 25, 2002, while in Rostov-on-Don, Lozovoi robbed an apartment and killed its owner, stealing a collection of antiques (jewelry and ancient orders) amounting to 400 thousand rubles. In August, he killed a taxi driver on the highway leading to the Oktyabrsky District, stealing 6 thousand rubles. In September, while he was in Sochi with accomplice Andrei Pismensky, both robbed and killed a married couple, stealing money and property worth 200 thousand rubles. In the same month, while in the vicinity of Roston-on-Don, Lozovoi killed another taxi driver, stealing 5 thousand rubles. And finally, he killed a saleswoman in the village of Bagaevskaya, robbing her of 4 thousand rubles.

After the last murder, Lozovoi went into hiding, but Pismensky, the accomplice in the Sochi murder, was arrested. The offender immediately gave a confession and told about Lozovoi, after which the court sentenced Pismensky to 17 years imprisonment. But Lozovoi managed to escape, and was subsequently put on the international wanted list. On October 17, 2008, he was arrested in Novocherkassk when he arrived in a taxi to the house of a local jeweler. Police seized an air gun, converted from an improvised firearm, and photos depicting a Margolin pistol, as well as a $500 Makarov, $500-$600 TT and $400-$700 Nagant. Law enforcement officials suggested that might be much more murders committed by Lozovoi.

Forensic psychiatric examinations found that Lozovoi was sane. According to the conclusion of psychiatrists, he was an excitable psychopath — aggressive, antisocial and cruel. On December 17, 2009, the Rostov Regional Court, on the basis of the jury's conviction, sentenced him to life imprisonment. The Supreme Court of Russia left the sentence unchanged, and Sergey Lozovoi is currently serving his sentence in the White Swan prison of the Perm Krai.

=== In the media ===
- Documentary film Following the tracks of the giant from the series "Criminal Chronicles".

== See also ==
- List of Russian serial killers

== Literature ==
- In the Rostov Region, a serial killer was caught. Moskovsky Komsomolets, October 21, 2008
