= Nikolai Litvin =

Russian serial killer and rapist

- Born: Nikolai Nesterovich Litvin; 1960 (age 65–66); Almaty, Kazakh SSR
- Other names: "The Prokopyevsk Strangler" "The Prokopyevsk Chikatilo"
- Conviction: N/A
- Penalty: Involuntary commitment

Details
- Victims: 10+
- Span of crimes: May – August 1999
- Country: Russia
- State: Kemerovo
- Date apprehended: August 1999

Nikolai Nesterovich Litvin (Russian: Николай Нестерович Литвин; born 1960), known as The Prokopyevsk Strangler (Russian: Прокопьевский душитель), is a Kazakhstani-born Russian serial killer and rapist who murdered at least ten girls and young women in Prokopyevsk, Kemerovo Oblast, one of them being pregnant. Recognized as insane at the time of the murders, he was sent to an undisclosed psychiatric facility to be treated for his mental illness.

== Early life ==
Relatively little is known about Litvin's early life. Born in 1960 in Alma-Ata in the Kazakh SSR, he grew up in impoverished circumstances. Due to his slender build and short stature, he was bullied by peers and ignored by women.

After graduating from high school, Litvin became engaging in criminal activities, and in the early 1980s, he was convicted of rape. Upon his release from prison, Litvin left the Kazakh SSR and moved to the Kemerovo Oblast in Russia, ultimately settling in Prokopyevsk. He eventually found work at the Kokksovaya Mine, where he was regarded positively and was even allocated a room in one of the city's hostels.

In 1994, Litvin married a woman named Alena, who suffered from epilepsy and was half his age. Between 1995 and 1999, the couple had three children.

== Murders ==
Beginning in May 1999, young girls and women started disappearing from Prokopyevsk in the span of 10–12 days. The bodies of eight would be found around the various parks and forests surrounding the area, each of them raped before death and subsequently strangled with their own undergarments. As the victims were killed in a similar manner, the authorities were alarmed that a potential serial killer was operating in the city. Numerous witnesses were interviewed, from whose statements, an identikit of the offender was created: aged 35–40, small in stature, noticeable bald patches and a peculiar forelock, a large nose and "closed eyes".

In August 1999, the authorities detained a man matching that exact description: Nikolai Litvin, a local resident and father of three who had convictions for rape. Much to the investigators' surprise, not only did Litvin immediately confess to the killings but also revealed two others which, up until that point, were unreported to the authorities. Litvin would later lead investigators to the burial sites and additionally admitted that at the time of his capture he had already marked himself another victim. He claimed that his motive was an ideological hatred towards prostitutes but this contradicted his actions since several of his victims, including a pregnant woman, had never worked in the sex industry. This, in addition to the contrast of being able to detail his actions to the most minuscule of details, but being unable to recreate the murder despite his hardest efforts, led to Litvin being examined by researchers at the Serbsky Center in Moscow. The psychiatrists concluded that, at the time of the murders, Litvin had no concrete grasp on reality and thus couldn't understand the gravity of his actions, posing a very serious threat to others around him. As a result, he was sent to a closed psychiatric institution, where he is being nursed to this very day. The case caused a stir in the region, with many locals, even those who lived outside Prokopyevsk, demanding the death penalty for Litvin. Although there are only ten victims officially recorded, some authorities have expressed concern that he could've killed many others prior to his arrest who still haven't been accounted for.

== See also ==
- List of Russian serial killers

== Bibliography ==
- Antoine Casse and Irina Kapitanova (2023). The phenomenon of Russian maniacs. The first large-scale study of maniacs and serial killers from the times of tsarism, the USSR and the Russian Federation (Russian: Феномен российских маньяков. Первое масштабное исследование маньяков и серийных убийц времен царизма, СССР и РФ), Eksmo, ISBN 5046081180
