= Murad Nurmagomedov =

Russian serial killer

- Born: Murad Magomedzapirovich Nurmagomedov; Dagestan ASSR, Russian SFSR
- Other name: "The Kaspiysk Chikatilo"
- Convictions: Murder x4 Drug trafficking
- Penalty: 18 years

Details
- Victims: 4–5
- Span of crimes: 2013 – 2016 (confirmed); 2004–2016 (alleged)
- Country: Russia
- States: Dagestan, Moscow
- Date apprehended: December 26, 2016

Murad Magomedzapirovich Nurmagomedov (Russian: Мурад Магомедзапирович Нурмагомедов), known as The Kaspiysk Chikatilo (Russian: Каспийск Чикатило), is a Russian serial killer who killed four acquaintances in Moscow Oblast and Dagestan from 2013 to 2016, and remains a suspect in a 2004 murder. Convicted for the latter crimes, he was sentenced to 18 years imprisonment.

== Murders ==
=== Ramazan Kayaev ===
On March 15, 2004, Nurmagomedov called over his friend, Ramazan Kayaev, to come over to his house. Accompanied by another friend, Kayaev went and inquired about when he would be repaid for a certain sum of money he had given to Nurmagomedov, to which he replied that he did not have the necessary amount yet. On the following morning, Kayaev received a phone call from his friend and was informed that he had gathered the money. Surprised by this news, he got into his car and drove to Nurmagomedov's house.

As the house passed by, Kayaev's wife and friends began to worry about him and opted to call him on his cellphone, but received no reply. They then submitted a complaint to the local police department which resulted in Nurmagomedov being detained for questioning in the case. During the interrogation, he denied any involvement in Kayaev's disappearance, claiming that he had gone to his house, taken the money and promptly left. Due to the lack of evidence to charge him, Nurmagomedov was released. The department's actions were criticized by Kayaev's family members, especially his mother, all of whom believed that he had been protected by his uncle, Kheyzudin Abdurashidov, a former police officer who was now the head manager of the Municipal Unitary Enterprise "Treatment Facilities". The case eventually went cold, and no new developments would occur for more than a decade.

=== Further murders ===
In August 2013, Nurmagomedov visited a friend of his, surnamed Chernyshev, at the latter's house in the village of Chelobityevo, Moscow Oblast. For unclear reasons, the pair got into a quarrel that resulted in Nurmagomedov grabbing a nearby knife and stabbing his friend to death. In order to hide the body, he dragged to the nearby road and buried it in a shallow grave.

From August to December 2016, Nurmagomedov treated his home in Kaspiysk as a drug house, where he would sell marijuana and tramadol to friends and acquaintances. On December 6, he had invited an acquaintance surnamed Aduev into the house, but they got into a quarrel that ended with Nurmagomedov beating Aduev to death with a table leg and then burying his body in the yard. Four days later, he repeated this with another friend, Bashirova, whom he also beat to death and then buried her corpse in the yard. His final victim, a neighbor surnamed Aizarov, was lured to the house on December 25 and then hit at least five times on the head with an axe. In this case, Nurmagomedov also stole the victim's car.

== Arrest, trial and imprisonment ==
The day after Aizarov's disappearance, Nurmagomedov drove to his father-in-law's house with it, where the car was immediately recognized as belonging to the missing man. As a result, Nurmagomedov was arrested and questioned about the recent killings, with him admitting responsibility for all five of his known murders, including those of Kayaev and Chernyshev. When queried about the Kayaev case, he claimed that he had dismembered the body after killing him, stuffing the head and hands in a barrel while the other remains were put in a bag and dumped near a wastewater treatment plant. Nurmagomedov then showed the authorities where he had dumped Kayaev's remains and that he had sold his car's parts in Manas.

As Kayaev's remains were not found, it was decided that he would not be charged in this case and instead put on trial for the other four murders, in addition to charges of running a drug den and drug trafficking. If convicted, he faced the possibility of a life term. Nurmagomedov would eventually be convicted on all counts, but for reasons unknown, he was given a lesser sentence of 18 years imprisonment, which he has to serve at a corrective labor colony. At present, it is unclear if he will be charged with Kayaev's murder, or if the murder is still under investigation.

== See also ==
- List of Russian serial killers
