= Andrei Dudnik =

Russian footballer

Personal information
- Full name: Andrei Nikolayevich Dudnik
- Date of birth: 2 May 1981 (age 45)
- Height: 1.78 m (5 ft 10 in)
- Position: Midfielder

Youth career
- FC Chernomorets Novorossiysk

Senior career*
Years	Team	Apps	(Gls)
2000–2001	FC Chernomorets Novorossiysk	1	(0)
2000	→ FC Chernomorets-d Novorossiysk (loan)	34	(0)
2002	FC KAMAZ Naberezhnye Chelny	9	(0)
2003	FC Lada Togliatti	20	(1)
2003–2004	FC Alnas Almetyevsk	52	(2)
2005	FC Novorossiysk (amateur)		
- * Club domestic league appearances and goals

Andrei Nikolayevich Dudnik (Russian: Андрей Николаевич Дудник; born 2 May 1981) is a Russian former football player.
