= Yevgeny Petrov (serial killer) =

Russian serial killer, rapist and pedophile

- Born: Yevgeny Nikolaevich Petrov; 17 December 1975 (age 50); Novouralsk, Sverdlovsk Oblast, RSFSR, Soviet Union
- Other names: "The Novouralsk Ripper" "New Ural Chikatilo"
- Conviction: Murder
- Penalty: Life imprisonment

Details
- Victims: 11
- Span of crimes: 1998–2003
- Country: Russia
- State: Sverdlovsk
- Date apprehended: 8 August 2003

Yevgeny Nikolaevich Petrov (Russian: Евге́ний Никола́евич Петро́в; born 17 December 1975), known as The Novouralsk Ripper (Russian: Новоуральский потрошитель), is a Russian serial killer, rapist and pedophile.

== Biography ==
In 1992, Petrov was conditionally sentenced for stealing a computer. While serving in the army, he almost killed his commander, but the case was concealed by the military prosecutor's office itself. He graduated from a vocational school with the speciality of a fitter, and worked as a combine operator with his father.

He had a common-law marriage and a small son. Petrov did not smoke or drink and generally led a normal lifestyle. He also loved motorsports.

In 1998, a schoolgirl named Maria Polivtseva went missing. She was on a visit to relatives alone but never arrived at their home.

In 1999, another schoolgirl who was visiting her grandmother disappeared briefly after leaving the house. In the same year, another girl went missing while walking around with her parents at the city pond. And again in the same year, two more girls went missing as well.

In 2000, right in the middle of the day, a 14-year-old girl was kidnapped in front of her younger sister. The man wanted to take both girls away, but the younger girl managed to escape.

The investigation suggested that the girls were taken into sexual slavery, which meant that there was a chance of finding them alive. Soon, a local artist reported a suspicious man who was carrying a child with him and drew his portrait. The investigation was skidding, and the situation in the city was getting heated. Authorities did not want to recognize the existence of a serial killer, and therefore security measures were not taken in the city. But soon after, five half-burned and dismembered bodies of missing girls were found in a nearby forest (the sixth body was found later), all of them raped before being killed.

Suddenly, the murders stopped. It was suggested that the criminal was imprisoned, and all prisoners in the area were examined.

But in 2003, at the gates of a children's camp, a female volleyball player was kidnapped. Local fishermen soon found her mutilated corpse in the river. The investigators soon learned that just before the murder, a young man was seen driving a car and suggested to local schoolgirls to take a ride with him. To one of them, he revealed that his name was "Petrov". Soon after, Yevgeny Petrov was arrested, and under the weight of the evidence, he confessed to 11 murders.

Petrov said that he caught girls on the roads, forced them into his car and then drove them to a secluded spot where he would rape, kill, dismember and burn them afterwards. In an interview with journalists, he admitted his guilt but expressed no remorse. Two additional cases were also revealed, in which Petrov's victims actually managed to survive. In 2005, the court sentenced him to life imprisonment.

While in prison, Petrov tried several times to commit suicide in his cell. The parents of his victims demanded the death penalty, and the father of one of them offered that Petrov be extradited to them.

=== In the media ===
- The documentary film "Sinister Triangle", hosted by Eduard Petrov from the series "Honest Detective", is based on Yevgeny Petrov's case.

== See also ==
- List of Russian serial killers
- List of serial killers by number of victims
