= Sergey Chyorny =

Russian serial killer

- Born: Sergey Anatolyevich Chyorny; 11 May 1977; Odessa, Ukrainian SSR, Soviet Union
- Died: 24 June 2001 (aged 24); Sychyovka, Smolensk Oblast, Russia
- Other names: "The Beast" "The Smolensk Strangler" "The Smolensky Chikatilo" "The Alien" "The Tape Man"
- Conviction: Murder
- Penalty: Compulsory treatment

Details
- Victims: 10–11
- Span of crimes: 19 August – 22 December 1999
- Country: Russia
- State: Smolensk
- Date apprehended: 23 December 1999

Sergey Anatolyevich Chyorny (Russian: Серге́й Анато́льевич Чёрный; 11 May 1977 – 24 June 2001), known as The Beast (Russian: Зверь), was a Ukrainian-born Russian serial killer who killed 10 girls aged between 15 and 23 years in Smolensk from August to December 1999.

== Biography ==
Chyorny grew up in a small house with a disabled mother, his younger brother Mark and his sister. Since childhood, he was engaged in sports, and was the champion of the Smolensk Oblast in martial arts. Having gone into the army, he served in an elite battalion of deep reconnaissance. After his return, he learned that his brother had joined a criminal group in Smolensk. He did not follow in his footsteps, and began to work as a security guard in one of the markets of Smolensk. Chyorny had a habit of wearing both winter and summer camouflage uniforms. In his own words, "his girlfriend did not [wait] for him to return from the army and got married". After this, he decided to take revenge.

In August 1999, Chyorny attacked a girl, hitting her, pushing her into the bushes, and trying to strangle her. However, the girl cried out, and when he saw that a man was approaching, Chyorny ran away. On 19 September, Chyorny strangled a girl in the vicinity of the town of Komintern, who was going to a disco. He took off her outer garments and pulled the earrings from her ears. The body was soon found in a ravine near the place of the murder. On 24 September, Chyorny also killed another girl at the spring in the Redovka Park in the same way. At her neck, a bra was tied tightly in a knot. The deceased had lost a leather jacket, a leather waistcoat, a breastplate, a bunch of keys and a ticket. On 27 September, in the village of Vishenka, in an abandoned warehouse, the corpse of a girl was found, with signs of strangulation, who went missing on 24 September. On the neck, a belt from the jacket was tied in two knots. On 29 September, in front of GSK "Tikhvinka-3" the body of another strangled girl was found. A loop of thin strap from a purse was fastened around her neck and tied back to two knots. UVD Smolensk seriously engaged in the disclosure of the murder series, and the killer, feeling the danger, "fell to the bottom", not betraying himself and not committing new atrocities. A month later, the murderer reappeared, strangling two more girls in three days. On 4 November, near the Yasennaya River, which flowed in the ravine between the village of Vishenka and the garage-building cooperative "Svet-2", the corpse of a girl was found, photographs of whom were hanging on search trays for two days around the city. On the neck of the deceased, the murderer had tied a handkerchief and a belt from his coat tightly around her neck, and her outer clothing, a gold ring, earrings and a watch were stolen. On 6 November, in the forest belt in the nuclear power plant-80 area, half a kilometre from the Krasninskoe highway, the body of another victim was found and had lost her passport and student card. On 22 November, Chyorny met a girl in the city centre. The next day, he invited her to go on a walk and get some fresh air, to which she agreed. When they met, they got into his car and went for a drive. Suddenly, Chyorny attacked the companion, tried to strangle her, then threw her into the trunk and drove her to the outskirts, where he hung her from a tree with her own sneakers' shoelaces. However, the girl survived and soon turned to the police, but because of the shock experienced, she was confused and could not provide any valuable information. In early December, the investigators managed to find the victim who survived the August attack, who said that she had seen the criminal in one of the city's markets. For several days she was taken to the markets of Smolensk, and on 14 December, she pointed the detectives on the man who attacked her. The suspect was placed on surveillance round the clock, including using a hidden camera. When they looked through the record with the suspect's image, one of the detectives said that he knew a very similar person - a member of a local criminal group named Mark Chyorny. It turned out that Mark was the younger brother of the main suspect - a 22-year-old security guard of a private security company Sergey Chyorny. Meanwhile, corpses were still found around the city. On 17 December, in the ravine for GSK "Zvezda" in the second Krasninskiy lane, the corpse of another girl was found with a leather belt from a coat tied on two knots around her neck. On 22 December near the Yasennaya River in the "Readovka" park another corpse was found. Subsequently, the Chyorny brothers were detained.

=== Arrest ===
On 23 December, almost simultaneously, with a difference of half an hour, both brothers were detained. In the apartments where Mark and Sergey lived, a search was conducted, and as a result, a red jacket from one of the victims was found in Sergey's apartment, which was a shock to the killer himself. At the first interrogation, it was revealed that he did not have an alibi for any of the murders.

With a more thorough search of Chyorny's apartment, jewels from the murdered girls and firearms unrelated to the case were found. Chyorny soon confessed to everything and even reported two more murders. One of them was committed in mid-August, and the other - in late October. Among other things, Chyorny confessed to another murder, telling how he drowned one victim in a creek, which law enforcement considered an accident first. But Chyorny's fault in this death was later questioned.

Chyorny was sent for a forensic medical examination, with the second exam result diagnosing him with schizophrenia. He was sent for compulsory treatment in a special psychiatric hospital. On 24 June 2001, Chyorny died from pneumonia.

== In the media ==
- Documentary film "The Black Ribbon" from the series "Criminal Russia" (2002)
- Documentary "Diagnosis: The Maniac" (2004)/ Top Secret. Maniacs. Documentary investigation (16 October 2012)

== See also ==
- List of Russian serial killers
- List of serial killers by number of victims
