= Nikolai Dudin =

Russian serial killer

- Born: Nikolai Arkadievich Dudin; 22 December 1973 (age 52); Mikhalkovo, Ivanovo Oblast, RSFSR, Soviet Union
- Other names: "The Grim Maniac" "The Furmanov Chikatilo"
- Conviction: Murder
- Penalty: Life imprisonment

Details
- Victims: 13
- Span of crimes: 1987–2002
- Country: Soviet Union, later Russia
- State: Ivanovo
- Date apprehended: 17 July 2002
- Imprisoned at: White Swan

Nikolai Arkadievich Dudin (Russian: Никола́й Арка́дьевич Ду́дин; born 22 December 1973), known as The Grim Maniac (Russian: Обидчивый маньяк), is a Soviet-Russian serial killer who killed 13 people in the town of Furmanov between 1987 and 2002.

== Biography ==
Nikolai Dudin was born on 22 December 1973, in the village of Mikhalkovo, Ivanovo Oblast. Dudin was beaten by his father throughout childhood, who instilled in him a number of skills that would later facilitate his murders, such as teaching him hunting and butchering. On 3 December 1987, Dudin fatally shot his father, Arkady Dudin, with a sawed-off shotgun. His body remained hidden until a year later, when Nikolai was arrested for rape, and confessed to his father's murder. Since he was just 14 years old at the time, Dudin was given a reduced sentence of 7 years. During his time in prison, he was repeatedly penalized for defiance of the administration, attempting to organize a riot and escape, and attempting to kill a prisoner from a neighbouring cell. He was convicted of said attempted murder and subsequently released in 2000, 12 years after his original conviction.

The next murder Dudin committed was on 15 February 2002. His victim was an employee of the Furmanov telecommunications company. In a state of intoxication, he struck her with a hard blunt object on the head, breaking the base of the skull, as a result of which the victim died. Dudin later claimed that he had intended to rob her. Afterwards, on the very same day, he committed a double murder, the victims being two female employees of a local sewing shop. Dudin claimed to have been flirting with the two women, but they rejected his advances, prompting him to stab them with a knife. The first woman was stabbed 28 times, and the second was stabbed 32 times.

The killer committed the following murders during the May holidays: on the night between 1 and 2 May 2002, a resident of the city disappeared without a trace, her body being discovered only after Dudin was arrested. On 8 May, he committed a triple murder. In a state of intoxication, he leaned on the fence of a house on Kremlyovskaya Street bringing it down. The owner of the house, Andrei Polozov, was present, and Dudin pulled out his sawn-off and opened fire. Then he shot the wife and killed their 11-year-old daughter with a knife. On 10 May, Dudin committed another triple murder under similar circumstances. The situation in the city was heated, and panic ensued, as Dudin committed a double murder shortly after.

On 17 July 2002, the killer was captured red-handed with a new murder attempt. On 6 August 2002, he wrote a confession, explaining his motive was that he killed people who humiliated his dignity. In December 2003, Dudin was sentenced to life imprisonment in a special regime colony by the Ivanono District Court. The Supreme Court of Russia then upheld the verdict without change. He is currently serving his sentence in the White Swan prison.

== See also ==
- List of Russian serial killers
- List of serial killers by number of victims
