= Alexander Polischuk =

Ukrainian serial killer (1969–1996)

- Александр Сергеевич Полищук
- Born: Олександр Сергійович Поліщук; 29 September 1969; Kherson, USSR
- Died: 17 December 1996 (aged 27); Kherson
- Other name: "Kherson Chikatilo"
- Years active: 1993 – December 1994
- Conviction: Death penalty

Details
- Victims: 11+
- Country: Ukrainian SSR
- State: Kherson Oblast
- Date apprehended: January 1995

Aleksandr Sergeyevich Polischuk (Ukrainian: Олександр Сергійович Поліщук, Russian: Александр Сергеевич Полищук; 29 September 1969, Kherson, Kherson Oblast, Ukrainian SSR, USSR – 17 December 1996, SIZO-28, Kherson, Kherson Oblast, Ukraine), also known as Kherson Chikatilo, was a Ukrainian serial killer. He committed at least 11 murders of women and children, accompanied by rape, between 1993 and 31 December 1994, in Kherson, Ukraine.

In December 1995, Aleksandr Polischuk was sentenced to death, but his sentence was not carried out, as he died in jail of pneumonia on 17 December 1996.

== Early life ==
Polischuk was born on 29 September 1969 in Kherson. He spent his childhood and youth in a prosperous environment. During his school years, Polischuk was involved in martial arts. After graduating from school in 1987, Polischuk was drafted into the Soviet Army. After demobilization, he returned to Kherson, where he got a job in the police, subsequently advancing to sergeant. During this period, he married a local woman who bore him 2 children. Polischuk began to experience financial difficulties due to low police wages. Starting in late 1992, he began to earn extra money as a taxi driver. In 1993, Polischuk's mental state deteriorated sharply. He met representatives of the Krishnaite sect, became a follower, and periodically traveled to Kyiv to attend their meetings.

== Murders ==
Between 1993 and 31 December 1994, Polischuk committed at least 11 murders of girls, women, and children, accompanied by rape. At the end of December 1994, he raped and slaughtered an entire family: a daughter, mother, and grandmother. A few days later, on 31 December of the same year, he committed a double murder. His victims were the wife of one of his acquaintances and their young son. Having raped and killed the woman in front of the boy, Polischuk put him to bed, after which he stabbed him three times.

=== Arrest, investigation, trial and death ===
During the investigation of the last two murders, law enforcement agencies found a witness who saw a policeman leaving the murder site. Based on his testimony, a photofit of the criminal was made, from which the husband of the murdered woman identified Polischuk. In January 1995, surveillance was established on him. During this period Polischuk demonstrated signs of mental disorder and exhibited deviant behavior and was detained and interrogated.

Polischuk initially denied his involvement, after which he fell into a state of anger and rage, began to read prayers and make unflattering statements about humanity, blaming everyone for his failures. In the fifth hour of interrogation, Polischuk admitted his involvement in committing 11 murders, but stated that he committed all the crimes under the influence of otherworldly forces, which gave him orders through voices of unknown origin. Beginning in January 1995, Polischuk, over the next several months, under escort, took part in investigative experiments in the city of Kherson, where at the crime scenes he showed investigators his actions and described the circumstances under which the crimes were committed.

In the spring, at the request of Polischuk's lawyers, a forensic medical examination was conducted; he was declared sane, although he showed signs of psychopathy with a disorder of sadistic sexual desires. The trial opened in July 1995. On 18 December 1995, the court found the evidence collected by the investigation to be exhaustive, found Alexander Polischuk guilty of committing 11 murders and sentenced him to death. During the investigation and trial, Polischuk was held in SIZO-28 in Kherson, where after the end of the trial in early 1996, he became seriously ill. During a medical examination, he was diagnosed with pneumonia, from complications of which he died on 17 December 1996.

== See also ==
- List of serial killers by country
