= Oleg Zaikin =

Russian serial killer (1972-2006)

- Born: Oleg Anatolievich Zaikin; 18 November 1972; Zaigrayevo, Buryat ASSR, RSFSR
- Died: 20 November 2006 (aged 34); Ufa, Bashkortostan, Russia
- Cause of death: Suicide by hanging
- Other names: "The Chernikov Maniac" "The Urals Chikatilo"
- Conviction: N/A (died before trial)
- Penalty: N/A (died before trial)

Details
- Victims: 9+
- Span of crimes: 2001–2006
- Country: Russia
- States: Chelyabinsk, Sverdlovsk, Orenburg, Tyumen, Tatarstan, Buryatia
- Date apprehended: 6 October 2006

Oleg Anatolievich Zaikin (Russian: Олег Анатольевич Заикин; 18 November 1972 — 20 November 2006), known as The Chernikov Maniac (Russian: Черниковский маньяк), was a Russian serial killer who committed at least 9 murders in 6 regions across Russia between 2001 and 2006.

== Biography ==
Unlike many serial killers, Zaikin grew up in a completely prosperous family. His mother worked in the local school, and his father worked in a factory. However, since childhood, deviations had been evident in his behaviour. Oleg grew up closed and unsociable, and was inclined to antisocial behaviour; for example, burning the door of a neighbour's house or destroying school textbooks. He often lied, was dodgy, and was noted as a juvenile offender to the police. In 1992, Zaikin was drafted into the army. After attempting suicide, he was commissioned. According to some reports, Zaikin was sexually assaulted by fellow soldiers in the army. Around this time, he became easily excitable and unpredictable, once even severely beating a friend. At that moment, according to his own account, he felt a previously unknown pleasure, and since then he experienced pleasure when torturing his victims.

After the army, Zaikin did not want to work, but it was forced upon him by his father, bringing the young man to his factory where he had worked all his life. A month later, Zaikin and his friends committed a major robbery at the enterprise. Upon learning this, his father hanged himself. Zaikin was under a written undertaking not to leave his home, but disappeared, and was declared wanted as a federal criminal. He got himself fake documents and began to make a living by stealing.

The first murder Zaikin committed was killing his female roommate in Chelyabinsk, a year after fleeing from his house. Zaikin beat her badly, but did not calculate the force of the blows, and she died. In 2005, Zaikin killed three people in Yekaterinburg. The victims were a woman and two children aged 3 and 4, all of them raped and strangled. He stole 45 thousand rubles from their apartment. In April 2006, Zaikin committed another murder in Orenburg, and in May, he killed a 49-year-old woman and a 16-year-old teenager in Kazan. In August, he kidnapped and raped an 11-year-old girl in the city of Zelenograd, near Moscow. The girl survived, although she received several serious stab wounds. The case received wide publicity, as the girl indicated the temporary whereabouts of the criminal.

Also, the maniac committed more murders in Tyumen and Ulan-Ude. He interspersed the murders with hundreds of burglaries. Zaikin would climb in from first floor windows, and would wrap his fingers with adhesive tape so as not to leave fingerprints. He also attempted several more murders, but did not manage to complete them. In addition to all of the above, he also committed several rapes.

=== Arrest, trial and suicide ===
Zaikin was identified quickly enough, but due to his roaming criminal ways, he was not arrested for a long time. For his capture, the police appointed a reward. On 6 October 2006, in the Ordzhonikidzhevsky District of Ufa, Zaikin was detained in a rented apartment. In his apartment, a hunting knife measuring 26 centimetres was found, a pack of condoms used during rapes, and, most unusually, an icon. During the investigation, he talked emotionlessly about all the crimes committed in five years. On the aggregate of crimes he was threatened with life imprisonment, but on 20 November 2006, in SIZO No. 1 in the city of Ufa, Zaikin hanged himself with his bed sheets. The criminal case was dismissed in connection with the death of the accused.

== See also ==
- List of Russian serial killers
