= Irina Churilova =

Russian soprano opera singer

- Born: Novosibirsk, Novosibirsk Oblast, Russia
- Education: Novosibirsk Conservatory
- Employer(s): Novosibirsk Opera Theatre (2008–2018); Mariinsky Theatre (2018–present)

Irina Churilova (Russian: Ирина Чурилова) is a Russian soprano opera singer, soloist of the Mariinsky Theatre (since 2018).

== Biography ==
Churilova was born in Novosibirsk. After graduating from school, she entered the Novosibirsk Musical College named after Askold Murov.

In 2008, while still a student at the Novosibirsk Conservatory, Churilova came to the Novosibirsk Opera Theatre. In 2009 she graduated from the Novosibirsk Conservatory.

She subsequently trained under Diane Zola (Houston Grand Opera) and the vocal teacher Enzo Ferrara (La Scala Theater), as well as Montserrat Caballé, who twice invited Churilova to take part in her concerts at the Liceu Theater in Barcelona, in 2012 and 2014.

== Career after the Novosibirsk Opera Theatre ==
In 2018 the soloist broke off relations with the Novosibirsk Opera Theatre. She appeared on the Novosibirsk stage for the last time on 22 May, when she sang the part of Amelia in Verdi's Un Ballo in Maschera. On 14 December 2018, the soloist officially left the theatre.

In 2018, Churilova became a soloist with the Mariinsky Theatre, where she had first performed in 2013. She sang in the premieres of the performances The Queen of Spades (2015), Simone Boccanegra (2016), The Maid of Orleans (2021), and others. Churilova is currently lead soprano at the Mariinsky Theatre, performing soprano roles from the Russian, Italian, German and French repertoires, mostly in Tchaikovsky, Verdi, Wagner, Rimsky-Korsakov and Puccini operas.

Churilova participated in international tours with Mariinsky, as Iolanta in Iolanta in Rome, Hamburg, and Munich (2018), Berlin, Luzern, Budapest, Paris (2019), as Lisa in The queen of spades in Baden-Baden (2015), Shanghai (2016) and Tokyo (2019), and as Elisabeth in Don Carlo (Tokyo, 2019).

Her international career includes performances in such opera houses as Teatro Alla Scala (2022, “La Gioconda”), Deutsche Oper Berlin (2019-“Un Ballo in maschera”, 2021-“Un Ballo in maschera”, “Don Carlo”), Arena di Verona (2017-“Aida”), Gran Teatro del Liceu (2022-“The Queen of spades”), Grand Theatre of Geneve (2019-“Un Ballo in maschera”), Opera Tenerife (2024-“Ariadne auf Naxos”), Teatro Lirico di Cagliari (2023-“Andrea Chenier”), Opera Graz (2017-“Norma”), Teatro Municipal di Santiago (2018-“Norma”), Savonlinna Opera Festival (2018-“The Queen of spades”)

== Awards ==
- Laureate of the III Russian Vocal Competition named after V. Barsova (Sochi, 2007; 1st prize)
- Laureate of the XLIX International Vocal Competition in Toulouse (2012; second Grand Prix)
- Finalist of the XXI International Operalia Competition (Verona, 2013)
- Laureate of the XXXIII International Hans Gabor Belvedere Singing Competition (Düsseldorf, 2014; 1st Prize and Audience Award)
- Laureate of the LI Francisco Viñas International Vocal Competition (Barcelona, 2014; IV prize and special prize for the best performance of Russian music)
