= Konstantin Cheryomushkin =

Soviet serial killer and rapist

- Cheryomushkin (left) during the investigation
- Born: Konstantin G. Cheryomushkin; 1963
- Died: 1993 (aged 29–30); Novocherkassk, Rostov Oblast, Russia
- Cause of death: Execution by shooting
- Other names: "The Bataysk Maniac" "Chikatilo's Double" "The Bataysk Killer" "The Bataysk Murderer"
- Status: Executed
- Conviction: Murder with aggravating circumstances
- Penalty: Death

Details
- Victims: 4
- Span of crimes: 1986–1989
- Country: Soviet Union
- State: Rostov
- Date apprehended: 1989

Konstantin G. Cheryomushkin (Russian: Константин Г. Черёмушкин, sometimes his surname is wrongly spelled as Cheryomukhin/Черёмухин; 1963 – 1993), known as The Bataysk Maniac (Russian: Батайский маньяк) and Chikatilo's Double (Russian: Двойник Чикатило), was a Soviet serial killer. He raped and killed four girls in the satellite town of Bataysk in Rostov-on-Don, Rostov Oblast, Russian SFSR.

== Biography ==
The exact date of birth and birthplace of Cheryomushkin is not clear. He was a spoiled child who always got what he wanted. It is known that in his youth Cheryomushkin learned that his father was not really his father, as he was barren and allowed his mother to have children from extraneous men. Specialists believe that the discovery deformed Cheryomushkin's psyche. He was tried twice for car theft.

The series of murders began in 1986. The first murder (that of Svetlana Yefimova) was committed by Cheryomushkin earlier that year, after which he burned the body of the murdered girl at a stake. All three subsequent murders (Elena Gaeva, Tanya Khloboschina and Oksana Yakovenko) were also committed with particular cruelty. He offered the intended victims a ride in his personal car, then brought them to a deserted place and raped them before he killed them. After the murders, Cheryomushkin cut off their mammary glands and external genitalia from the victims.

In those years in the Rostov Oblast another killer, Andrei Chikatilo, was operating. Search for him involved a whole team of investigators from the Prosecutor's Office of the RSFSR, there was an operation named "Lesopolosa" to catch the killer. The investigators drew attention to the murders in Bataysk, initially assuming that the same killer was operating there. But then the investigation revealed that the murders were committed by another person since he travelled to the crime scene by car and took away the victims' valuables (unlike Chikatilo). Cheryomushkin hoped that his crimes would be compared to that of Chikatilo. The investigators were surprised that a cunning and cautious killer began to kill in the midst of a large-scale operation to catch another criminal.

In early 1989, Cheryomushkin was arrested and soon confessed. On 3 November of the same year, the Rostov Regional Court sentenced him to death. In 1993, he was executed by firing squad.

=== In the media ===
- Documentary film from the series "The investigation was conducted... - Chikatilo's twin"

== See also ==
- List of Russian serial killers
