= Oleg Chizhov =

Russian serial killer and rapist (born 1970)

- Born: Oleg Yurievich Chizhov; 14 March 1970 (age 56); Birsk, Bashkir SSR, RSFSR
- Other names: "The Birsky Maniac" "The Birsky Monster" "The Birsky Chikatilo"
- Conviction: Murder
- Penalty: 22.5 years of imprisonment

Details
- Victims: 4
- Span of crimes: 2006–2007
- Country: Russia
- State: Bashkortostan
- Date apprehended: August 2007

Oleg Yurievich Chizhov (in some sources mistakenly called Andrey Kryukov) (Russian: Олег Юрьевич Чижов; born 14 March 1970), known as The Birsky Maniac (Russian: Бирский маньяк), is a Russian rapist and serial killer. He committed a series of brutal murders, committing one of the crimes with accomplices.

== Biography ==
Chizhov was born into a prosperous family and graduated with honours from a mathematical school. He served his military service in the Airborne forces, as part of the GSFG, then studied at a pedagogical institute. He opened up his own business, becoming the owner of an automobile repair shop. His first girlfriend was named Sveta who lived in Birsk, and dumped him for another Tatar man named Finat, this was one of his initial heartbreaks which led to him becoming a maniac. In 1994, Chizhov married and two years later had a daughter, but the family later split up, with the wife filing for divorce and taking the child. During the investigation, she explained that the reason for the divorce was the fact that her husband constantly cheated on her, often drank, and also beat her and their daughter. After the divorce, Chizhov began to dislike women.

The first offence was committed in March 2006. Rudik Minibaev (b. 1986) and his friend Roman Mindibayev (b. 1984), who worked in the auto shop, brought to Chizhov, as a "birthday present", a girl named Tatiana Kuznetsova, whom the three of them raped, and after a while the half-dressed girl was thrown out in the forest, where she died from hypothermia. The body was found a month later. In May, Minibaev and Mindibayev fell under suspicion, and a minor acquaintance, who was an eyewitness to the crime, testified against them. Both of them were taken into custody, and Minibaev confessed to the crime, but nobody gave away Chizhov. There was information that the examination did not give evidence against the suspects. Minibaev and his acquaintance declined their testimony, saying that they were tortured by the police. The story was publicized widely, with law enforcement agencies being accused of arbitrariness by the mass media. Minibaev and Mindibayev were released, and received a compensation of 100,000 rubles through the court.

From April 2006 to July 2007, Chizhov committed 4 more rapes and 4 murders associated with rape in Birsk and the Mishkinsky District. All the victims were choked to death, three of them buried in a forest near Birsk, and the last one drowned in the Belaya River. To commit the crimes, Chizhov used his clients' cars, where he abducted girls from the streets of Birsk, or picked them up at hitchhiking spots. One of the surviving victims filed a rape application against him, but initially, she was refused a criminal case. It is suggested that the reason for the refusal was that among some of Chizhov's regular customers were police officers.

In July 2007, Chizhov committed his last crime. The killer picked up a girl who hitchhiked on the road, took her to a deserted place, raped and tried to strangle her. But a casual witness frightened him away and the victim remained alive. She remembered the number of the car, but did not recognize the rapist. Through the registration number, the detectives came to Chizhov, who by that time had moved to Tolyatti, and was arrested in August.

After receiving the results of the examination, which gave evidence against Chizhov, including the first crime for which he was not suspected, the criminal agreed to cooperate. He gave confessions and showed the locations where he buried the bodies. Mindibayev and Minibaev, his accomplices on the first crime, were again arrested. In May 2009, the Supreme Court of the Republic of Bashkortostan found Chizhov guilty of 4 murders associated with raped and 5 rapes. The first crime, despite the death of the victim, was not qualified as a murder, but as "criminal endangerment". According to the totality of crimes, Chizhov was sentenced to 22.5 years of imprisonment in a strict-regime colony. Mindibayev and Minibaev received 8.5 years of imprisonment and were obliged to return the compensation amount paid after their first arrest. The Supreme Court of Russia upheld the verdict without charges.

It was suggested that Mindibayev and Minibaev were not acquainted with Chizhov and were not involved in the crime. The question of its reliability remained open. On 29 March 2012, the head of the Investigative Department of the Investigative Committee of Russia for the Republic of Bashkortosan, Aleksei Kasyanov, denied the claims of torture against both of them, and said that it was just an attempt to discredit the investigation.

=== In the media ===
- Documentary film "A trip to the cost of life" from the series "Criminal Chronicles"
- Documentary film "The Birsky Maniac" from the series "Honest Detective"

== See also ==
- List of Russian serial killers
