= Toregeldy Zharambaev =

Executed Kazakh serial killer

- Born: Toregeldy Shukurullayevich Zharambaev; 1964; Shymkent, Kazakh SSR
- Died: 1993 (aged 28–29); SIZO-1, Shymkent, Kazakhstan
- Cause of death: Execution by shooting
- Other name: "The Shymkent Chikatilo"
- Conviction: Murder x33
- Penalty: Death

Details
- Victims: 33–50+
- Span of crimes: 1990–1992
- Country: Soviet Union, later Kazakhstan
- State: Shymkent
- Date apprehended: early 1992

Toregeldy Shukurullayevich Zharambaev (Kazakh: Төрекелді Шөкіроллаұлы Жарамбаев, romanized: Törekeldı Şökırollaūly Jarambaev; Russian: Торегельды Шукуруллаевич Жарамбаев; 1964–1993), known as The Shymkent Chikatilo (Russian: Шымкентский Чикатило), was a Soviet–Kazakh serial killer and rapist who raped and murdered at least 33 children, teenagers, and adults of both sexes in and around Shymkent between 1990 and 1992. His crimes were noted for their extreme cruelty and lack of a definitive victim profile.

Caught and convicted for his confirmed crimes, Zharambaev was executed in late 1993. He is considered the most prolific single serial killer in Kazakh history.

== Early life ==
Toregeldy Zharambaev was born in 1964 in Shymkent, the third child of a poor, but law-abiding and seemingly normal family. In spite of his parents' efforts to raise the children as upstanding citizens, the young boy started exhibiting aggressive behavior early on towards everyone around him, including members of his own family.

According to his own claims, Zharambaev first had sex at age 15, where one of his girlfriends infected him with a venereal disease. He was also ill-regarded at school for constantly bullying other children and being subjected to disciplinary measures. After completing the eighth grade, he refused to study further and was unable to find a job.

In 1982, Zharambaev was drafted into the Soviet Army, where he was bullied by older servicemen. During one such incident, he received a head injury that led to a sharp decline in his mental health. Upon completing his mandatory service, he returned to his parents' home, but was soon after arrested for exhibiting aggressive behavior. He was sent to a psychiatric clinic for examination at the request of the prosecutor's office, where he was diagnosed with schizophrenia and subsequently interned for treatment.

After receiving treatment, Zharambaev returned to Shymkent, where he lived off of disability pensions and received annual treatment at the local psychiatric clinic for one month and a half. Zharambaev himself claimed that during this time he became an alcoholic and got addicted to smoking marijuana. In 1986, he married a local woman and had a son with her. The family lived with Zharambaev's parents, who frequently criticized him for not working and living off of his relatives.

== Murders ==
=== Modus operandi ===
By the late 1980s, Zharambaev's aggressive outbursts worsened, and by the onset of 1990, he would turn to murder. In total, between 1990 and 1992, he was officially linked to at least 33 murders in and around Shymkent, all of which followed a particular modus operandi. When he found a suitable victim, Zharambaev would strike them on the head from behind with a heavy object, and would then beat or stab them to death. After killing the victim, he would then mutilate the remains, insert various objects into their orifices and even masturbate on them. Unlike a majority of other serial killers, Zharambaev had no particular victim type – he killed victims of both sexes, regardless of age, nationality, sexual orientation, or other factors.

=== Murders ===
Zharambaev's first confirmed murder occurred in February 1990. While drinking at a local canteen, he started a conversation with Kenes Zhakauov, a junior sergeant of the Soviet Army who was waiting to catch a train to his hometown of Kyzylorda. That same evening, Zharambaev persuaded his new friend to accompany him into town so he could buy Zhakauov a couple more bottles of vodka. Once they were approximately one kilometer away from the station along the railroad tracks, Zharambaev attacked Zhakauov, striking him on the head with a hammer he had hidden in one of the sleeves on his coat. Zhakauov fell to the ground, where he was beaten to death with the hammer. Zharambaev then stripped the corpse naked and sodomized it with a large branch, which he left inside the victim's anus. Satisfied with the murder, he stole documents and money from the dead man and left the scene.

While investigating the murder, an identikit was created based on the testimony of a barmaid who had seen the victim with an unfamiliar man. According to her, the stranger had an asthenic physique; had no noticeable distinguishing features; was tall and approximately 30 to 35 years old.

The killer's next victim was 16-year-old Lyazat Duisebayeva, whom Zharambaev noticed quarreling with her boyfriend and then going for a walk in a park without him. Zharambaev followed her to a dark section of the park and struck her with a hammer, after which he pulled out a knife and stabbed her 92 times. A forensic examination concluded that while the victim was not raped, there were traces of semen on the body – it was later established that Zharambaev got excited at the sight of her bloodied body and masturbated over it.

A few weeks later, Zharambaev came across 12-year-old Yevgeny Shapovalov, who was looking for a part-time job. After promising him employment, he lured the boy to a nearby park, where he struck Shapovalov on the head and beat him to death. He then proceeded to sodomize the corpse with a large stick, which he left inside the victim's anus, and proceeded to masturbate over it.

The next victim was 16-year-old Marat Zhakipbayev, who was returning home with friends after attending a wedding. Once home, the group decided to start drinking vodka in the yard, with the intoxicated Zhakipbayev deciding to go for a walk at some point. When an hour passed and he did not return, his friends went out to search for him, only to find him dead in a pool of his own blood. Zharambaev had encountered the drunk youth by chance and attacked him, beating him to death with his hammer. He then sodomized the body with a stick, but apparently unsatisfied with this, he then took out a knife and carved the words "get married" on one of Zhakipbayev's thighs. In the aftermath of the murder, local authorities started looking into the victim's drinking buddies and friends, and later on all the attendants of the wedding ceremony, but since Zharambaev was not among them, they were unable to produce any leads on the killer.

A few days after killing Zhakipbayev, Zharambaev attacked 30-year-old driver Mahmud Burakhodjaev, fracturing his skull with a hammer. After killing the man, Zharambaev knocked out his teeth, stabbed him in several places, and severed his genitalia with a knife. Before leaving the scene, Zharambaev inserted a stick into Burakhodjaev's anus. Zharambaev, having taken the victim's severed genitalia with him, went to the Enbeksha District Registry Office in the early morning, tied them to a rope, and left them hanging on the door. Burakhodjaev's mutilated remains were discovered a few days later.

For the remainder of 1990 up until his arrest in 1992, Zharambaev committed 28 further murders using similar methods, but no information has been publicly released about these killings.

== Arrest ==
By early 1992, a task force headed by Zhetkergen Suyupbergenov was assembled to investigate the murders, and they eventually received a tip about a disturbing incident. According to the witness, a nurse at a local psychiatric clinic, he and several other passers-by stumbled upon a man sexually abusing a 7-year-old boy whom he attacked with a hammer in a local park in the middle of the day, who was frightened off when he saw them. The witness claimed that the man was Toregeldy Zharambaev, a patient at the clinic he worked at.

Deciding to look further into the man, Suyupbergenov and his officers went to Zharambaev's house to conduct an inspection – once inside, they found several bloodied weapons such as a hammer, a knife, and some weights, as well as passports, military IDs, cut teeth, hairbrushes, wristwatches, women's handbags, and even bloody underwear that likely belonged to the victims. Zharambaev was arrested on the spot, and when officers continued to search through the house, they found two shallow graves with bodies inside near a shed, with a further corpse buried in the yard. The body found in the yard was that of a woman, but her identity was never established.

=== Involvement of parents and confessions ===
Zharambaev's elderly parents were taken in for interrogation, where they revealed to the police that they were aware that their son was a serial killer. Once asked as to why they never reported him to the authorities, both of them stated that it was primarily because of their distrust of authorities due to the abuses conducted by them against the civilian population following the collapse of the USSR, as well as death threats by their son.

In his own interrogation, Zharambaev was asked about the murdered woman found in his yard. He claimed to have met her on the street in Shymkent and offered her to stay at his place, where he locked her inside a box. Zharambaev claimed that he sexually assaulted her for several weeks, after which he beat her to death with a rolling pin and a hammer. He did not remember the victim's name, stating only that she was in her early 20s.

When asked about a motive, Zharambaev did not provide any definitive reason. He only said that he despised those who were either richer than him or were happily married.

== Trial, sentence, and execution ==
Throughout the interrogations, Zharambev often had mood swings and periods of depression followed by hyperactivity, during which he actively cooperated with investigators and gave detailed testimony about each murder. After some time, he recanted everything and claimed to have carried out the murders on the orders of a mysterious voice.

Since there was a crisis in the Kazakh healthcare system following the USSR's collapse, Zharambaev was transferred to the Serbsky Center in Moscow, Russia, to undergo a forensic psychiatric exam. After two months, he was declared sane and extradited back to Kazakhstan to stand trial.

His trial began in early 1993 and lasted for a relatively short amount of time, as the evidence against him was exhaustive. In the end, Zharambaev was found guilty and sentenced to death, with all of his subsequent appeals being rejected. Sometime in late 1993, he was executed with a single gunshot to the back of the head at the SIZO-1 in Shymkent.

Zharambaev's parents were also charged with failing to report their son's crimes, but at the end were given suspended sentences.

Since his execution, the true number of Zharambaev's victims has remained a subject of debate. The former lead investigator of the case, Zhetkergen Suyupbergenov, stated his belief that Zharambaev likely committed around 50 murders in total, but prosecutors were only able to find sufficient evidence for 33 of them.

== See also ==
- List of serial killers by country
- List of serial killers by number of victims

== In the media and culture ==
Zharambaev inspired the events of the eighth episode of the Kazakhstani true crime TV series 5:32, titled "Shalkar's Wedding". The series' scriptwriters were later sued by journalist Askar Djaldinov, who alleged that they plagiriazied his book covering the original cases, including that of Zharambaev.

== Bibliography ==
- Askar Djaldinov (2020). Вне протокола. Тайны громких преступлений в Казахстане [Off the Record. Secrets of High-Profile Crimes in Kazakhstan] (in Russian). Case.
