= Vladimir Tushinsky =

Russian serial killer, rapist and pedophile

- Born: Vladimir Petrovich Tushinsky; 14 September 1976; Petropavlovsk-Kamchatsky, Kamchatka Krai, RSFSR
- Died: 5 August 2016 (aged 39); Khabarovsk, Khabarovsk Krai, Russia
- Other name: The Kamchatka Chikatilo
- Conviction: Murder
- Penalty: Life imprisonment

Details
- Victims: 5
- Span of crimes: 2010–2014
- Country: Russia
- State: Kamchatka
- Date apprehended: 17 February 2014

Vladimir Petrovich Tushinsky (Russian: Влади́мир Петро́вич Ту́шинский; 14 September 1976 – 5 August 2016) was a Russian serial killer, rapist and paedophile. Between September 2010 and February 2014, he killed five girls aged between 11 and 22 in the Kamchatka Krai. In the media, he was nicknamed The Kamchatka Chikatilo. He was detained on 17 February 2014, and charged with murder, as well as raping his underage stepdaughter. On 19 February 2016, the Kamchatka Regional Court sentenced him to life imprisonment, with the Supreme Court of Russia upholding the verdict without change. On 5 August 2016, while he was being transferred to the colony on Ognenny Ostrov, Tushinsky suddenly died.

== Biography ==
Tushinsky was born on 14 September 1976.

In 1997, he was convicted of theft and beatings, and according to some media reports, was nicknamed "Bald" in the colony. After his release, he married, and along with his wife and her daughter from her first marriage, moved to the Pionersky settlement in the Yelizovsky District; a son was born there soon after. In the autumn of 2009, he got a job as a fuel supply engineer in boiler room No. 3 of JSC Kamchatskenegro in the Mokhovaya micro-district of Petropavlovsk-Kamchatsky.

According to the investigators, in 2005, Tushinsky raped his 11-year-old stepdaughter, Julia, and then continued to coerce her into cohabitation for four years. The girl did not dare for a long time to tell anybody what happened. In 2009, when she turned 16, she moved to the mainland, where her parents lived.

== Murders ==
After his stepdaughter was able to leave Tushinsky, investigators believe that because of his inability to satisfy his "pathological sexual desire", a tendency for misogyny arose. He began to drive around Petropavlovsk-Kamchatsky in his Toyota 4Runner in search of lone girls resembling his stepdaughter, and would offer them a ride. Once under his control, he would kill them either by stabbing or strangulation.

The first victim was 22-year-old Ulyana Nikiforova, who worked as a saleswoman in one of the shopping centres of Petropavlovsk-Kamchatsky; she was killed on September 12, 2010. The offender, who used a knife, inflicted numerous blows to the face, head and body. The body was found in the tall grass next to the road connecting Petropavlovsk-Kamchatsky and Yelizovo.

Tushinsky committed the next murder a month later. On the evening of 10 October, 15-year-old Natalya Moiseyeva stood by a "BAM" shop waiting for the bus, where she was seen by the criminal. Shortly before her disappearance, the schoolgirl phoned her parents and said that she could not go home, because there was no bus; after 20 minutes her phone was out of range. The remains of the girl were found two years later by a woman who was collecting mushrooms in the Mokhovaya micro-district.

On 18 November 2010, the criminal killed 11-year-old Olga Besprozvannaya, a high school student in Yelizovo, and then buried her corpse. Her parents told the police about her disappearance after she did not return to the village of Dvurechye after the end of the school day. For several weeks police and volunteers were looking for her, but they could only find her mobile phone, broken into pieces.

On 9 January 2011, Tushinsky killed 16-year-old Christina Orlova. The search operation again did not give any results, because, as in the Besprozvannaya case, the criminal carefully buried the body in a secret place.

The last murder Tushinsky committed was on 16 February 2014, in Petropavlovsk-Kamchatsky. He offered to give a ride to 20-year-old Irina Khodos, but she refused. "I just stopped and in a friendly way offered to give her a lift, and she became rude. She took out her phone, and threatened to call the police. I got scared, got in the car, but then I thought that she could blame me", the murderer later said. He inflicted more than 20 knife wounds on the girl, after which she died. He left the body at the "Stepnaya" bus stop, where it was later discovered.

=== Arrest ===
After the murder of Irina Khodos, the investigators contacted the locals through the media for help, counting on the fact that among them there might have been witnesses of the crime. After a while a man came to the regional department of the Ministry of Internal Affairs, passing a stop with his car when, according to him, the murder was committed. The DVR camera captured the Toyota 4Runner parked near the murder site; the registration numbers were not visible, however, the inscription "PICK UP" on the cockpit was visible. Law enforcement agencies discovered that the car belonged to Tushinsky, and on 17 February, he was arrested.

In the trunk of Tushinsky's car was an axe, taser, air gun, as well as female tights and an artificial vagina. After examining the car, traces of blood and hair from Khodos were found. Under the pressure of increasing evidence, the killer began to give confessions: he not only confessed to the last murder, but also to his previous crimes, and subsequently pointed out the burial sites of the bodies of Besprozvannaya and Orlova. During the search of Tushinsky's apartment, video records were found on his computer, on which he committed violent acts against his minor stepdaughter.

Soon the court gave Tushinsky a measure of restraint in the form of imprisonment, thus satisfying the petition for the investigation. A criminal case was initiated against him on the basis of crimes such as violent acts of a sexual nature, rape and murder of the Criminal Code of Russia.

== Trial ==
In early September 2015, Tushinsky's case, along with the indictment was referred to the court for examination. Previously, experts conducted more than 60 examinations, including complex forensic psycho-sexual ones, which revealed that the man showed signs of paedophilia, but was declared sane. At the same time, the investigators failed to find evidence that the murderer's victims had been sexually assaulted. The trial itself began on 7 October 2015, in the Kamchatka Regional Court.

During the judicial investigation, more than 70 volumes of the criminal case were examined. On 27 January 2016, the judicial debate began. The state prosecutor asked the court to appoint a final sentence in the form of life imprisonment to the defendant. Family members of the victims, who also spoke in the debate, supported the position of the prosecution. Tushinsky's lawyer asked for a softer punishment towards his client.

After the end of the debate, the court decided to appoint the last word of the defendant on February 9, but on the appointed day Tushinsky was not ready, as a result of which the meeting was postponed and held on February 11 instead. In his last words, he pled guilty to all counts and at the same time drew the court's attention to the contradictions in the victims' testimonies, witnesses, and the inadmissibility of a number of evidence materials in the case. Among other things, Tushinsky asked for forgiveness from the victims' families and said that he would "accept any punishment".

On 19 February 2016, the final hearing for the case took place. Tushinsky was found guilty of all counts and sentenced to life imprisonment, and to serve his sentence in a special regime colony. The court also granted civil claims to relatives of the victims for the amount of 12 million rubles, and also obliged the defendant to pay 500,000 rubles to his stepdaughter. The verdict was read out by the judge of the Kamchatka Regional Court, Dmitry Urban.

Tushinsky's defence team challenged the verdict. In July 2016, the Board of the Supreme Court inspected a video depicting the convict and three of the victims, and ultimately upheld the verdict without change.

=== Death ===
After the enforcement of the verdict, Tushinsky was ordered to serve his sentence in the special regime colony in Ognenny Ostrov. From Kamchatka, he was taken to a prison in Khabarovsk, where he was placed in solitary confinement under enhanced surveillance, which, in particular, had round-the-clock surveillance.

On 5 August 2016, Tushinsky died suddenly. According to official information, the cause of death was "sudden cardiac arrest without signs of violent death": according to the press service of the Federal Penitentiary Service of Russia in the Khabarovsk Oblast, at 17:50 the junior inspector received information that offender was ill. The medical officer, who examined him in the cell, called an ambulance brigade. At 18:58, the prisoner was taken to the intensive care unit of the Regional Clinical Hospital, where he was pronounced dead at 20:05.

== See also ==
- List of Russian serial killers
