= Roman Burtsev =

Russian serial killer and pedophile (1971–2023)

- Роман Бурцев
- Born: 13 April 1971; Kamensk-Shakhtinsky, Rostov Oblast, Russian SFSR, Soviet Union
- Died: December 2023 (aged 52); White Swan, Solikamsk, Perm Krai, Russia
- Other name: "The Chikatilo of Kamensk"
- Conviction: Murder
- Penalty: Death; commuted to life imprisonment

Details
- Victims: 6
- Span of crimes: 1993–1996
- Country: Russia
- State: Rostov
- Date apprehended: 17 July 1996
- Imprisoned at: White Swan Prison

Roman Vladimirovich Burtsev (Russian: Роман Владимирович Бурцев; 13 April 1971 – December 2023), known as The Chikatilo of Kamensk (Russian: Каменский Чикатило), was a Russian serial killer and child sex offender. Between 1993 and 1996, he raped and strangled six young children: five girls and one of the victims' brother. He committed all of the crimes in his hometown.

== Personality ==
Burtsev was born on 13 April 1971, in a family with a history of alcohol and domestic abuse. He was an introvert and did not stand out from other children. Burtsev's family history was burdened in another way as well: his father and older brother had convictions for rape. In the 6th grade, Roma committed an attack on a young girl in the school basement, which involved attempted rape: only a janitor who accidentally entered the basement prevented something terrible from happening. After the incident, he was registered with the police's juvenile department. Later, 15 years later, Romka Burtsev, now a serial killer and maniac, would be exposed, in part thanks to this episode in his biography: this peculiar “original sin” has made itself known again, but now it has attracted the attention of not only inspectors conducting preventive talks with difficult teenagers, but also seasoned investigators. Who investigated the case of a brutal series of child murders in the suburbs of Kamensk. After finishing school, studying at a vocational school and serving in the Soviet Army, Burtsev got married and found work as an electric welder at a machine-building plant. By nature he was a loner, secretive, withdrawn, and lived in his own world. He had an interest in perverted pornography, especially scenes of violence, some of which he duplicated during the executions of victims. At the same time, in his schizoid fantasies, Burtsev imagined himself as a hero of erotic films that he watched. There was another fact. According to Burtsev's testimony, he was traumatized by the fact that after his marriage, he learned that his wife had already lost her virginity. Having learned of this, he tried to get acquainted with schoolgirls from his district, after which he seduced his young lovers, persuading them to have sexual intercourse, but the hymen of each of them had already been torn. Subsequently during interrogations, he explained the child rapes as a desire to "try to regain virginity," and the murders as a desire to avoid detection. He wanted to “taste” “purity” as well.

== Modus operandi and series of murders ==
Burtsev differed from similar murderers, in that he carefully hid the victims' bodies. All bodies, except one, were found only after his arrest. Following psychiatric assessment, he was declared competent to stand trial, with psychiatrist Alexander Bukhanovsky calling him one of the most well-organized murderers he ever had to deal with.

=== The first murders ===
Roman Burtsev committed his first double murder on 15 September 1993, his victims being siblings 12-year-old Yevgeny Churilov and 7-year-old Olesya Churilova. The perpetrator met the children near a dump in the Zavodsky settlement. He wanted to rape the girl and, to get rid of the superfluous observer, killed Churilov, inflicting three blows to the boy's head with his fists and three more with a metal plate. Then he raped and strangled the girl, leaving the children's corpses in a garbage pit.

=== Victims ===
- 15 September 1993 — Yevgeny Churilov (12) and Olesya Churilova (7).
- 17 July 1994 — Marina Alexeyeva (12)
- 23 May 1995 — Anya Kulinkina (9). He seized the girl by force, raping and then killing her on the bank of the Donets.
- 1 July 1996 — Ira Ternovskaya (9)
- 16 July 1996 — Natasha Kirbabina (12)

== Arrest, trial and sentence ==
It was the desire to hide his crimes that drove Burtsev. After one of the crimes, he asked an elderly woman who lived nearby for a spade, with which he buried the corpse and then threw it away. Subsequently, the woman described in detail the appearance of the suspicious person. It was mentioned that a girl, whom Burtsev did not manage to drag away, helped catch the criminal.

Burtsev confessed to everything immediately after his arrest. The court sentenced him to death, which was later replaced by life imprisonment. He carried out his sentence in the White Swan prison (in Solikamsk, Perm Krai). Burtsev wrote letters to the "Russian Birch" Foundation, where he asked for help with medicines, because the local MCH did not always have the necessary drugs, and when they did the number of them was limited. He wrote that he had several medical conditions, including hemorrhoids, prostatitis, avitaminosis, varicose veins and nail fungus.

== Death ==
Burtsev died from cancer at the White Swan prison hospital in December 2023, at the age of 52.

== In the media ==
- The episode "Triangle of Death" from the TV program Inexplicable, But True (2005)
- The episode "Chikatilo's Heirs" from the TV program The Bad Nineties (2007)
- Moment of Truth (3 December 2012)

== See also ==
- List of Russian serial killers
