= Arshaly District =

Coordinates: 52°43′40″N 61°08′07″E

Arshaly
- District
- Arşaly audany
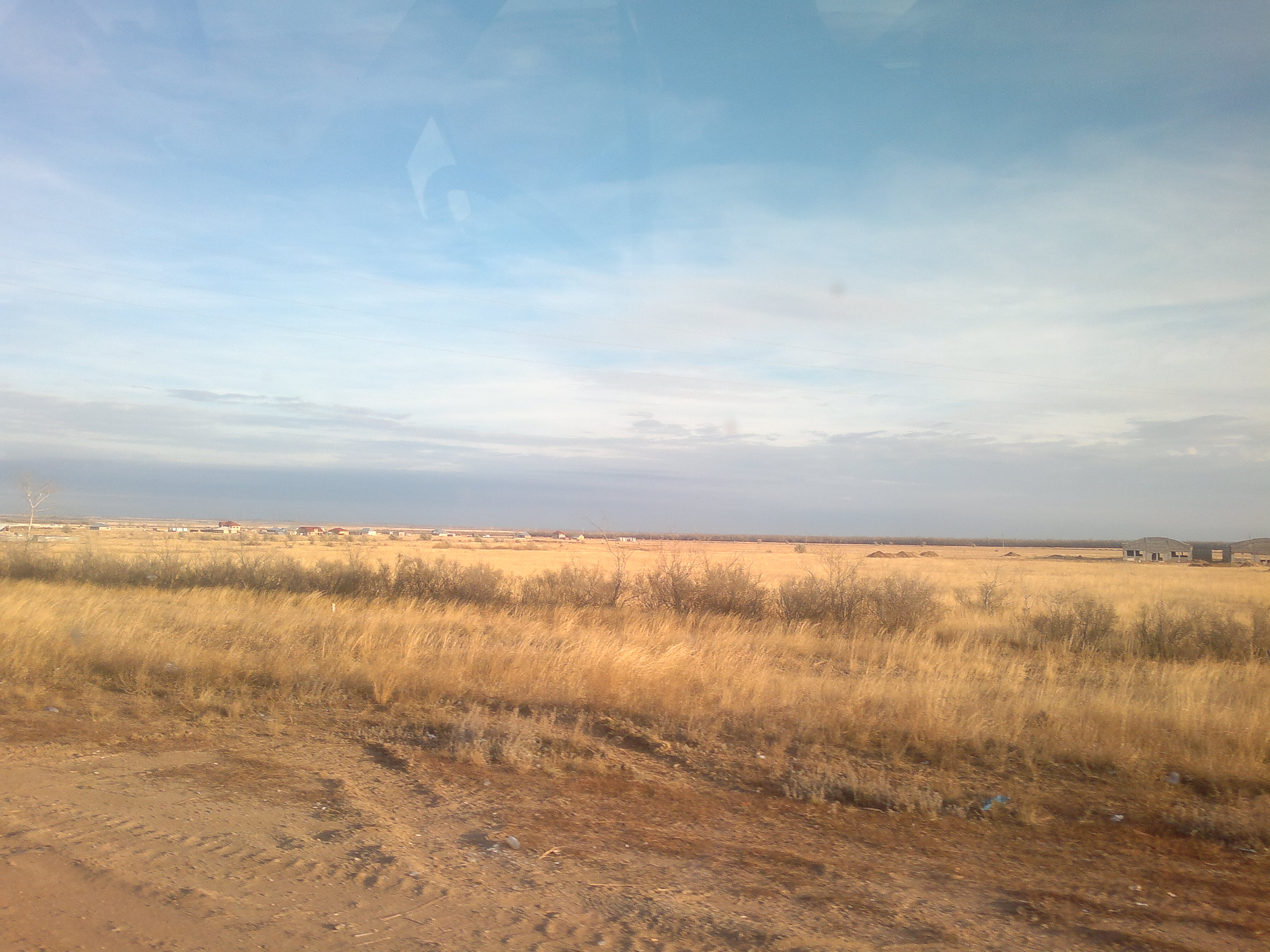

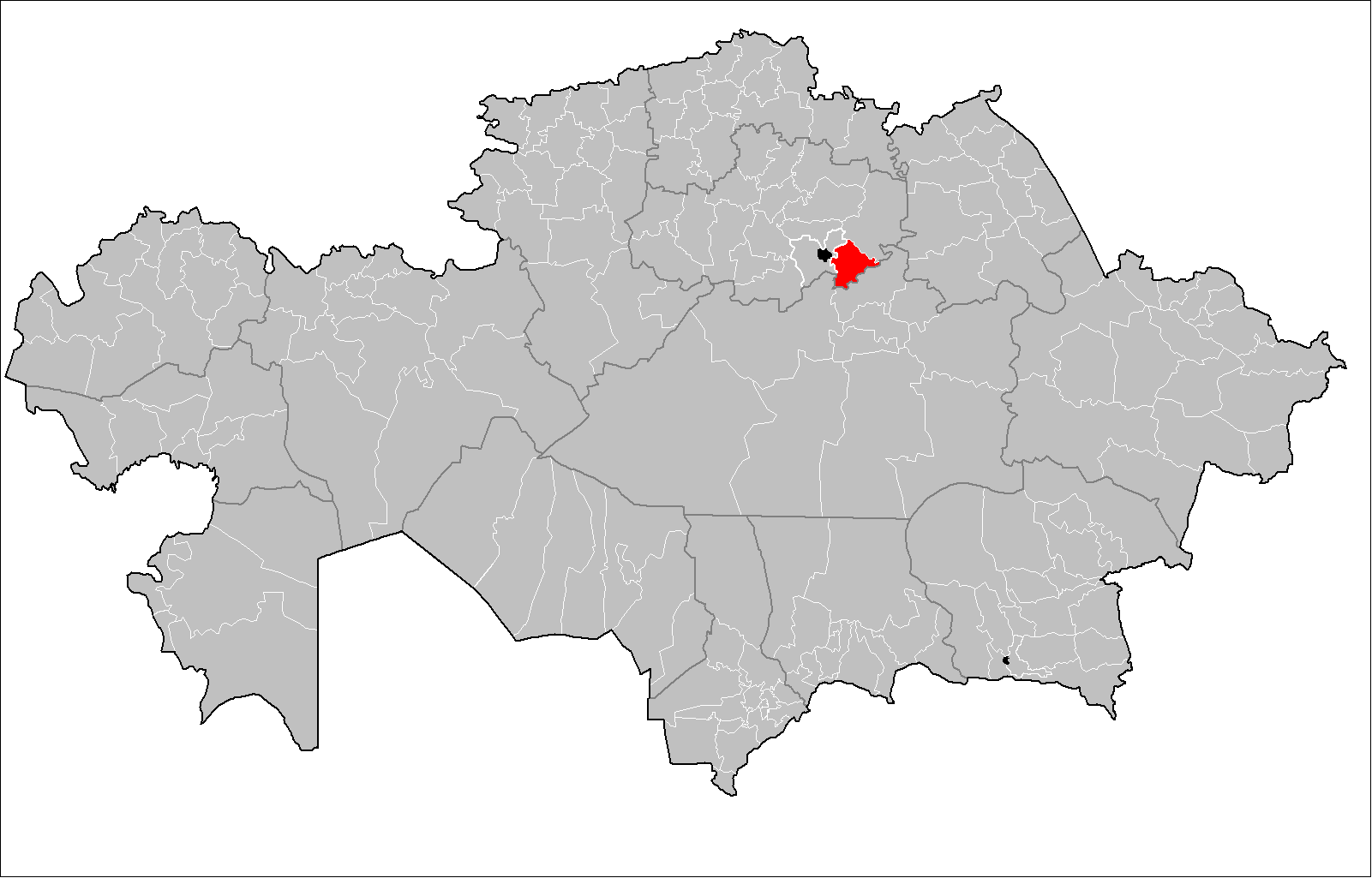
- Country: Kazakhstan
- Region: Aqmola Region
- Administrative center: Arshaly
- Founded: 1930

Government
  - Akim: Aidar Itemgenovich Baymanov

Area
  - Total: 2,200 sq mi (5,800 km^{2})

Population (2013)
  - Total: 27,119
- Time zone: UTC+6 (East)

Arshaly District (Kazakh: Аршалы ауданы, Arşaly audany) is a district of Akmola Region in northern Kazakhstan. The administrative center of the district is the settlement of Arshaly. Population: 27,940 (2009 census results); 29,620 (1999 census results).

== Geography ==
The district is located in the south-east of Akmola region, on the Kazakh melkosopochnik. The area of the territory is 5,800 km^{2}, which is 3.75% of the entire territory of the region (the 14th district in terms of territory size in the region). The length from west to east is 100 km, from south to north — 110 km.

Borders:

- with the districts of Akmola region:
  - in the north-west with the Tselinograd district;
  - in the northeast with the Yerementau district;
- with districts of Karaganda region:
  - in the south with Osakarovsky district;
  - in the southwest with the Nurinsky district.

The eastern part is occupied by the low southern spurs of the Yerementau Mountains. The climate is continental. Winter is cold, long-lasting; average temperature in January −17 °C; summer is moderately hot, average temperature in July is 20 °C. The average annual precipitation is 300–350 mm. The Ishim River flows through the territory of the district with tributaries of the Kyzylmol and Olenty. Most small rivers dry up in summer. Many lakes. The largest: Ulken and Kishi Saryoba, Balyktykol, Tanakol, Baidaly, Shalkar, Kyzylkol and others.

== History ==
The district was formed initially as Vishnevsky, by the Decree of the Presidium of the Karaganda Regional Executive Committee of February 10, 1935 as a result of the unbundling of the Akmola and Telman districts of the Karaganda region. The administrative center of the district was the village of Vishnevka (now the village of Arshaly).

By the decree of the Presidium of the Supreme Soviet of the Kazakh SSR of October 14, 1939, Vishnevsky district was transferred to the newly formed Akmola region.

By the Decree of the President of the Republic of Kazakhstan dated November 14, 1997 No. 3759 "On renaming certain administrative-territorial units of the Akmola region and changing their transcription" Vishnevsky district was renamed Arshalynsky district.

== Administrative division ==
Arshalynsky district — as a separate administrative unit of the 2nd level of Kazakhstan, includes 13 administrative-territorial entities of the 3rd level, including: 1 village administration and 12 rural districts.

№	Administrative division	Administrative center
1	Arshaly	Settlement of Arshaly
2	Akbulak Rural Okrug	Akbulak village
3	Arnasay Rural District	Arnasay village
4	Anar Rural District	Anar station
5	Bersuat Rural District	Bersuat village
6	Bulaksay Rural District	Bulaksai village
7	Volgodonovsky Rural District	Volgodonovka village
8	Zhibek Zholy Rural District	Zhibek Zholy village
9	Izhevsk Rural District	Izhevsk village
10	Konstantinovsky Rural District	Konstantinovka village
11	Mikhailovsky Rural District	Mikhailovka village
12	Saryobinsky Rural district	Saryoba village
13	Turgen Rural District	Turgen village
