= White Swan (prison) =

Federal prison in Russia

- Interactive map of White Swan
- Location: Solikamsk, Perm Krai, Russia; 59°40′18″N 56°45′53″E
- Status: Operational
- Capacity: 962
- Opened: 1938
- Managed by: Federal Penitentiary Service
- Governor: colonel Viktor Khomko

Federal Governmental Institution — penal colony № 2 with special conditions of economic activity of the main directorate of the Federal Penitentiary Service of Russia in Perm Krai, popularly known as White Swan (Russian: Белый лебедь, Belyy Lebed), is a prison in Solikamsk, Perm Krai, Russia. It is one of the seven maximum-security supermax prisons operated by the Federal Penitentiary Service for convicts sentenced to life imprisonment in Russia.

== History ==
White Swan was founded in 1938 as a penal colony by the Soviet Union to hold political prisoners, particularly priests, but was eventually used for common criminals as well. In 1955, a special decree of the CPSU Central Committee changed the colony to correct the so-called "Thieves in Law", and the main task of the prison was the total isolation and closure of all methods of communication between prisoners and the outside world. The Soviet authorities began to staff White Swan with some of the highest quality correctional officers in the country to control the Thieves in Law, in order to be able to withstand the bribes and intimidation.

In 1996, the death penalty in Russia entered a moratorium as a requirement for joining the Council of Europe, and a new criminal code introduced life sentences. In 1999, White Swan was re-purposed to house serious criminals serving life sentences and, unlike previous detainees, were not expected to ever leave the facility. The prison has roughly 300 inmates, one-third of its maximum capacity, held in cells of one, two and three people. All cells have a dossier containing photos, articles, and a brief "biography" of the detainees. White Swan was the first prison in Russia to feature an on-site professional psychologist, and the administration, after studying the prisoners, settles them based on psychological compatibility in order to avoid conflicts. The conditions of the prison supposedly correspond to the requirements of international standards, with a library, correspondence materials, a commissary, a weekly shower, and an hour-long walk per day. During White Swan's entire existence, there have been no confirmed escapes.

=== Origin of White Swan name ===
The origin of the prison's nickname is unknown, with one theory being the bright white painted walls of the prison building, while another being from the way detainees were moved across the prison, leaning forward (almost 90 degrees) with their hands thrown behind their back, appearing like a swan. The prison is also known by the slightly more formal name VK-240/2 (Russian: ВК-240/2).

== Notable inmates ==
- Salman Raduyev, Chechen separatist warlord, died at White Swan under mysterious circumstances in 2002.
- Yury Shutov, former deputy of the Saint Petersburg Legislative Assembly and a former aide to Anatoly Sobchak, the author of books Sobchak's Heart (about Anatoly Sobchak) and The Godfather of Piterskyes (about Vladimir Putin). Shutov was sentenced in February 2006 to life imprisonment for a number of murders, attempted murders, and kidnappings. Russian authors Yuri Felshtinsky and Vladimir Pribylovsky insist that the charges against Shutov were fabricated.
- Ali Taziev, Ingush militant leader.
- Adam Tsurov, terrorist and one of the perpetrators of the 1999 Vladikavkaz bombing.
- Dmitry Vinogradov, mass murderer.
- Aslan Usoyan, mafia boss and thief in law, first incarcerated at White Swan in the 1980s after being sentenced to 15 years in prison and then transferred.
- Sergey Lozovoi, criminal and serial killer.
- Denis Pischikov, robber and serial killer.
- Gennady Serebrennikov, serial killer and former major of Ministry of Internal Affairs.
- Sergei Martynov, serial killer.
- Pavel Safonov, serial killer who committed his crimes along with an accomplice
- Dmitry Karimov, serial rapist and serial killer.
- Roman Burtsev, serial killer and pedophile.
- Alexander Tchayka, spree killer.
- Nikolai Dudin, serial killer.
- Maxim Petrov, serial killer and former doctor.
