= Arshaly, Akmola Region =

Arshaly
- Settlement
- Location within Kazakhstan
- Coordinates: 50°50′03″N 72°10′18″E
- Country: Kazakhstan
- Region: Akmola Region
- District: Arshaly District

Population (2009)
  - Total: 7,051
- Time zone: UTC+5 (UTC + 5)

Arshaly (Kazakh: Аршалы, Arşaly; Russian: Аршалы) is a settlement in northern-central Kazakhstan. It is the administrative center of Arshaly District in Akmola Region. Population: 7,051 (2009 census results);7,208 (1999 census results).

Vishnyovka, an archaeological site with remainders of a settlement from the Paleolithic era, are located near the village.

== Climate ==
Climate data for Arshaly (1991–2020)
Month	Jan	Feb	Mar	Apr	May	Jun	Jul	Aug	Sep	Oct	Nov	Dec	Year
Mean daily maximum °C (°F)	−10.9 (12.4)	−9.4 (15.1)	−2.1 (28.2)	11.8 (53.2)	20.6 (69.1)	25.5 (77.9)	26.3 (79.3)	25.4 (77.7)	18.8 (65.8)	10.2 (50.4)	−1.8 (28.8)	−8.6 (16.5)	8.8 (47.8)
Daily mean °C (°F)	−15.4 (4.3)	−14.6 (5.7)	−7.0 (19.4)	5.4 (41.7)	13.4 (56.1)	18.6 (65.5)	19.6 (67.3)	18.1 (64.6)	11.6 (52.9)	4.0 (39.2)	−6.2 (20.8)	−13.0 (8.6)	2.9 (37.2)
Mean daily minimum °C (°F)	−19.8 (−3.6)	−19.4 (−2.9)	−11.6 (11.1)	−0.2 (31.6)	6.2 (43.2)	11.6 (52.9)	13.2 (55.8)	11.2 (52.2)	5.1 (41.2)	−1.1 (30.0)	−10.1 (13.8)	−17.3 (0.9)	−2.7 (27.1)
Average precipitation mm (inches)	16.1 (0.63)	15.7 (0.62)	17.5 (0.69)	22.2 (0.87)	33.5 (1.32)	39.6 (1.56)	54.6 (2.15)	31.1 (1.22)	21.3 (0.84)	25.5 (1.00)	26.4 (1.04)	20.9 (0.82)	324.4 (12.77)
Average precipitation days (≥ 1.0 mm)	5.4	5.1	4.7	5.3	6.3	6.8	7.8	5.2	4.3	5.9	6.4	6.6	69.8
Source: NOAA
