= Gritsenko =

Gritsenko or Hrytsenko (Ukrainian or Russian: Гриценко) is a gender-neutral Ukrainian surname that may refer to:

- Anatoliy Hrytsenko (born 1957), Ukrainian politician
- Irina Gritsenko (born 1968), Kazakhstani and French badminton player
- Marina Gritsenko (born 1980), Kazakhstani water polo player
- Nikolai Gritsenko (1912–1979), Soviet actor
- Nikolay Gritsenko (1856–1900), Russian painter
- Oleksandr Hrytsenko (1967–2020), Ukrainian poet
- Pavlo Hrytsenko (born 1950), Ukrainian linguist
- Vitalii Gritsenko (born 1985), Russian Paralympic athlete
- Yevhen Hrytsenko (born 1995), Ukrainian football goalkeeper
- Yuri Gritsenko (born 1962), Russian serial killer
