= Lidiia Dunayevska =

Ukrainian folklorist and teacher (1948–2006)

Lidiia Frantsivna Dunayevska (28 June 1948 - 16 May 2006) was a Ukrainian folklorist, teacher, literary critic, poet, doctor of philological sciences, professor, founder and first head of the Department of Folklore Studies of the Institute of Philology at Taras Shevchenko Kyiv National University.

== Early life and education ==
Lidiia Dunayevska (maiden name - Govoretska) was born in 1948 in the village of Vorobiivka, Vinnytsia region, in a family of teachers. Her parents, Frantz Martynovych and Sofiia Yakivna Govorecki, were supporters of education and high spiritual culture.

While studying in high school, Dunayevska began to write poems, and published them in regional and Kyiv newspapers. After graduating from high school, she entered the philological faculty of the Taras Shevchenko Kyiv National University at the department of Ukrainian language and literature as a winner of the Republican Olympiad in Ukrainian language and literature in 1966.

In 1971, Dunayevska graduated from the university with honors. Since then, she has worked at Taras Shevchenko Kyiv National University as a senior laboratory assistant, later an assistant and associate professor of the Department of the History of Ukrainian Literature. In 1982, Dunayevska defended her Ph.D. thesis on the topic Poetics of the Ukrainian Folk Tale.

== Career ==
In 1992, Dunayevska founded and headed the Department of Folklore Studies of the Faculty of Philology (since 2001, the Institute of Philology) of Taras Shevchenko Kyiv National University, initiating the professional training of folklorists in Ukraine.

In 1998, Dunayevska defended her doctoral dissertation Ukrainian folk prose (legend and fairy tale). The evolution of epic traditions, for which she received the scientific degree of doctor of philological sciences in 1999, and the academic title of professor of the Department of Folklore in 2001.

From 1992 until 2006, Dunayevska worked as the head of the Department of Folklore Studies. She was a deputy head of the Specialized Academic Council for the Defense of Doctoral Dissertations of the Institute of Philology.

Dunayevska was a member of the expert council of the Supreme Administrative Court of Ukraine, the expert council of the State Academic Council under the Ministry of Education and Science of Ukraine, the Writers' Union of Ukraine, the editorial boards of the “Veselka” ("Rainbow") publishing house, magazine "Kyivska Starovyna," and other publications.

Lidiia Dunayevska died on 16 May 2006. She was buried in Kyiv at the Lisove Cemetery.

== Pedagogical activity ==
The main pedagogical principle of Dunayevska was the preservation and formation and the integrity of the individual. As a teacher, she created an original method of teaching folklore, combining the traditions of academic teaching with various forms of direct communication of students with a living oral-poetic tradition. She called such classroom classes, where authentic speakers of folklore and the students themselves performed dumas, ritual songs, or staged performances of a nativity puppet theater, "illustrated lectures."

One of the forms of Dunayevska's educational work was the organization of folklore evenings, where students and representatives of different peoples of the world performed their original songs along with outstanding performers.

She created folklore clubs, where it was possible to prepare scientific folklore conferences and listen to reports and lectures of famous folklorists-contemporaries from the Rylsky Institute of Art Studies, Folklore, and Ethnology. Her students and postgraduates participated in numerous scientific conferences in Ukraine and abroad. In total, 29 candidate's and three doctoral theses were defended under the supervision of Dunayevska.

== Research activities ==
Professor Dunayevska is known in Ukrainian science primarily for her conceptual developments in the theory and history of Ukrainian folkloristics, the founder of the Department of Folkloristics, and the founder of the professional training of folklorists at Taras Shevchenko Kyiv National University.

After the opening of the department in 1992 and the specialty of folklore studies in 1993, and later the specialization of musical folklore studies in 2001, Dunayevska directed the scientific and pedagogical activities of the department to improve the following courses: "Oral Folk Art," "History of Folklore," "Theory of Folklore." She developed new courses such as "Ukrainian Mythology," "Customary Law," "World Epic," "Ethnopsychology," "Ethnopedagogy," "Folklore Teaching Methodology," "Folk Music," etc.

Dunayevska paid great attention to the study of the historiography of Ukrainian folklore. In particular, she was interested in the problems of the nature and specificity of Ukrainian folklore. She studied regional peculiarities of Ukrainian folklore, folklore-literary mutual influences, international connections in folklore, and folklore genres.

Ukrainian fairy tales and folk prose are among the main objects of Dunayevska's research. She had a scientific interest in studying archetypal images, world folklore universals, elements of Proto-Slavic mythology in Ukrainian oral and poetic literature, typology and evolution of various folklore genres, peculiarities of folklore life in modern civilizational conditions, etc.

== Compilation and publishing activities ==
The main task of Dunayevska as a folklorist was to record samples of folk art and popularize them, which she did with her composing activity. When compiling folklore collections for children, Dunayevska adhered to aesthetic and scientific principles in selecting and processing folklore materials. She selected fairy tales according to the classical classification by thematic groups: magical, about animals, and social and everyday fairy tales. Dunayevska tried to find the brightest examples of fairy tales from the point of view of content, an artistic realization of an idea, and a compositional solution. She searched for texts in various collections, unprinted sources, and ancient collections. Dunayevska insisted on careful, minimal processing of grammatical forms and lexical material, providing dictionaries at the end of the collections.

In total, Dunayevska was the compiler of more than 20 collections of Ukrainian fairy tales and fairy tales of the peoples of the world. She is the author of notes to the first volume of Mykhailo Hrushevsky's History of Ukrainian Literature (1993), the author and co-author of two university folklore textbooks.

Dunayevska published four collections of folk prose and songs and four collections of poetry. She created three scripts for scientific and educational films and a slide film. Dunayevska compiled about 20 educational programs and other educational materials for higher education institutions.

== Honors ==
For the best scientific research in folkloristics and philology, Dunayevska became a laureate of the Filaret Kolessa Prize of the National Academy of Sciences of Ukraine (2001). For her highly qualified selfless work, the scientist was awarded a certificate of the Verkhovna Rada of Ukraine (2005). Dunayevska became a laureate of the Pavlo Chubynskyi award (2007, posthumously).

== Monographs ==
- Ukrainian folk tale. - Kyiv: Higher School, 1987. - 127p.
- Ukrainian folk prose (legend, fairy tale) is the evolution of epic traditions. - Kyiv, 1998. - 447 p.
- Character system of Ukrainian folk mythological prose. Aspects of poetics. - Kyiv, Library of the Ukrainian, 1999.
