= Lidia Lykhach =

Ukrainian publisher and art curator (born 1961)

- Лідія Лихач
- Born: Lidia Petrivna Lykhach; 4 December 1961 (age 64); Krasnovolia, Ukrainian SSR, Soviet Union
- Education: Taras Shevchenko National University of Kyiv
- Occupations: Publisher; art curator
- Organization(s): RODOVID press, RODOVID art Gallery

Lidia Petrivna Lykhach (Ukrainian: Лідія Петрівна Лихач; born 4 December 1961) is a Ukrainian publisher, art curator, owner of RODOVID Press and RODOVID art gallery.

== Biography ==
Lykhach graduated from Krasnovolia High School in the Volyn region. She earned her degree in journalism from Taras Shevchenko National University of Kyiv. She began her career in Cherkasy, writing a cultural column for the newspaper Mолодь Черкащини (Youth of Cherkashchyna).

As Ukraine declared independence and the communist ban on private media were lifted, Lykhach launched the magazine RODOVID - Notes on the History of Ukrainian Culture and founded the publishing house RODOVID Press in 1993. She created publishing projects that highlight key aspects of Ukraine's cultural history. These projects include more than fifty albums, catalogs, and monographs published in Ukrainian, English, and French.

In addition to her publishing endeavors, she curates art exhibitions and organizes multimedia projects. Her curatorial interests include naïve and folk art, the Ukrainian avant-garde, contemporary Ukrainian photography, and contemporary art.

In 2003, Lykhach founded the RODOVID art gallery in Kyiv. Prior to that, she was an advisor to the Ministry of Culture and Tourism of Ukraine.

She is married to music ethnologist William Noll, author of The Transformation of Civil Society: An Oral History of Ukrainian Peasant Culture, 1920s–1930s. Lykhach has two children and lives between Kyiv and Kansas City.

== Selected publishing projects ==
- “HE AND I WERE UKRAINIANS”. Autobiographical Text by Kazimir Malevich. Ed. Peter Doroshenko. Kyiv: RODOVID press, 2025, ISBN 978-617-7482-75-7.
- Teura. Sophia Yablonska. Foreword: Oksana Zabuzhko. ISBN 978-6177-482-252.
- Yevhen Prychepiy, Tetiana Prychepiy: Embroidery Of Eastern Podillia / Вишивка Східного Поділля. Kyiv: RODOVID press, 2006, 2017, ISBN 966-7845-30-3.

== Selected curated exhibitions ==
- 2023: Die Bestie des Krieges – Naive Kunst aus der Ukraine, at Open art museum in St. Gallen
- 2017: Pure Art, at Mystetskyi Arsenal in Kyiv
- 2019: Through the lens: unbending life, at Ukrainian Institute of Modern Art in Chicago
- 2018: Ukrainian avant-garde: a non-fashion guide, at The Cultural and Information Centre of the Embassy of Ukraine in the French Republic in Paris
- 2011: Borys Kosarev: Modernist Kharkiv, 1915–1931, at Ukrainian Museum in New York City
- 2007: Ukrainian Sculpture and Icons, at Ukrainian Museum in New York City

== Selected publications ==
- IT TAKES THREE TO TANGO: The true story of a fictitious romance. The Correspondence of Ivan Ostafiychuk and Natalka Husar. Kyiv: RODOVID press, 2025. ISBN 978-617-7482-71-9.
- Pure Art / Чисте мистецтво. (with Petro Honchar). Kyiv: RODOVID press, 2020. ISBN 978-617-7482-11-5.
- Панас Ярмоленко. Портрет мого краю. (with Halyna Schtschupak, Petro Hontschar). Kyiv: RODOVID press, 2006. ISBN 966-7845-33-8.
- Ukrainian Folk Icons From The Land Of Shevchenko. (with Rostyslav Zabashta). Kyiv: RODOVID press, 2000.
