= Dnipro Choir =

Choir of Taras Shevchenko National University, Kyiv

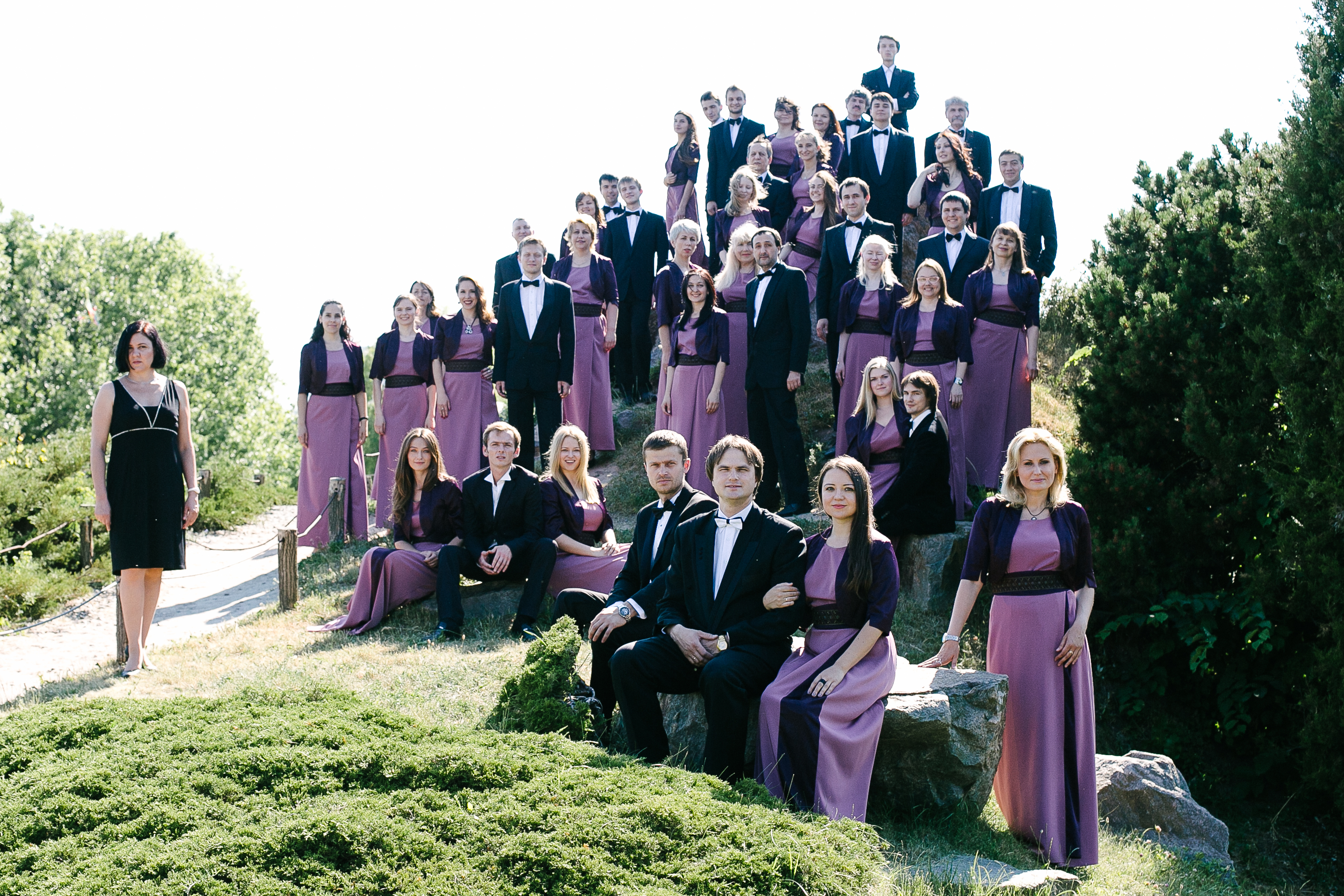
Dnipro choir (2015)

Dnipro Choir is a Ukrainian choir of Taras Shevchenko National University of Kyiv that was founded in 1843.

In 1860th the choir was under the artistic direction of Mykola Lysenko. In 1908 the choir performed under the baton of Oleksandr Koshyts.

Some famous musicians were associated with the choir, including regents Assing and Sokhanovsky, Volodymyr Stanislavsky; well-known composers Mykola Lysenko (founder of Ukrainian classical music), Yakiv Yatsynevych, Yakiv Kalishevskyi, Porfiry Demutsky; legendary choral conductor and composer Oleksandr Koshyts.

In 2017 the choir took the first place at the 36th international church music festival Hajnówka 2017 in Poland.

Current artistic director is Iryna Dusheiko.
