= 4868 Knushevia =

Hungaria asteroid and suspected binary system

Discovery
- Discovered by: E. F. Helin
- Discovery site: Palomar Obs.
- Discovery date: 27 October 1989

Designations
- Named after: Kyiv University (in Ukraine)
- Alternative designations: 1989 UN_{2} · 1988 DE_{5}
- Minor planet category: main-belt · (inner); Hungaria

Orbital characteristics
- Epoch 4 September 2017 (JD 2458000.5)
- Uncertainty parameter 0
- Observation arc: 33.39 yr (12,196 days)
- Aphelion: 2.0940 AU
- Perihelion: 1.8271 AU
- Semi-major axis: 1.9606 AU
- Eccentricity: 0.0681
- Orbital period (sidereal): 2.75 yr (1,003 days)
- Mean anomaly: 156.32°
- Mean motion: 0° 21^{m} 32.4^{s} / day
- Inclination: 22.108°
- Longitude of ascending node: 187.52°
- Argument of perihelion: 94.633°
- Known satellites: 1 (suspected)

Physical characteristics
- Dimensions: 1.535±0.322 km 2.30 km (calculated)
- Synodic rotation period: 3.1422±0.0002 h 4.45±0.01 h 4.54±0.01 h 4.717±0.002 h
- Geometric albedo: 0.4 (assumed); 1.000±0.000
- Spectral type: E
- Absolute magnitude (H): 13.9 · 14.26±0.41 · 14.8

4868 Knushevia, provisional designation 1989 UN_{2}, is a bright Hungaria asteroid and suspected binary system from the innermost regions of the asteroid belt, approximately 2 kilometers in diameter. It was discovered on 27 October 1989, by American astronomer Eleanor Helin at the Palomar Observatory in California, United States. The asteroid was named for the Kyiv University in Ukraine.

== Classification and orbit ==
Knushevia is a bright member of the Hungaria family, which forms the innermost dense concentration of asteroids in the Solar System. It orbits the Sun in the inner main-belt at a distance of 1.8–2.1 AU once every 2 years and 9 months (1,003 days). Its orbit has an eccentricity of 0.07 and an inclination of 22° with respect to the ecliptic.

== Physical characteristics ==
=== Lightcurves and satellite ===
Between 2008 and 2011, three rotational lightcurves of Knushevia were obtained from photometric observations by American astronomer Brian Warner. Lightcurve analysis gave a rotation period between 4.45 and 4.717 hours with an exceptionally low brightness amplitude of 0.01 magnitude (U=2/2/2).

In May 2015, Warner measured a period of 3.1422 hours with an amplitude of 0.09 (U=3). The photometric observation also revealed that Knushevia might be a binary asteroid with a minor-planet moon orbiting it every 11.922 hours. The results, however, are tentative only.

=== Diameter and albedo ===
According to the survey carried out by NASA's Wide-field Infrared Survey Explorer with its subsequent NEOWISE mission, Knushevia measures 1.535 kilometers in diameter and its surface has an outstandingly high albedo of 1.000.

The Collaborative Asteroid Lightcurve Link assumes an albedo for bright E-type asteroids of 0.40 – derived from 434 Hungaria, the family's largest member and namesake – and calculates a diameter of 2.30 kilometers based on an absolute magnitude of 14.8.

== Naming ==
This minor planet (Ukrainian: КНУШЕВІЯ; translit.: Knushevia) was named after Kyiv University (full name Ukrainian: Київський Національний Університет ім. Т.Шевченка, translit.: Кyivs'kyj Natsional'nyj Universytet іmeni (name) Shevchenka) for its great achievement in the education, science and culture of Ukraine. It is one of the oldest and most prestigious universities in Ukraine. The approved naming citation was published by the Minor Planet Center on 27 April 2002 (M.P.C. 45336).
