= NASU Institute of the Ukrainian Language =

Ukrainian research organization

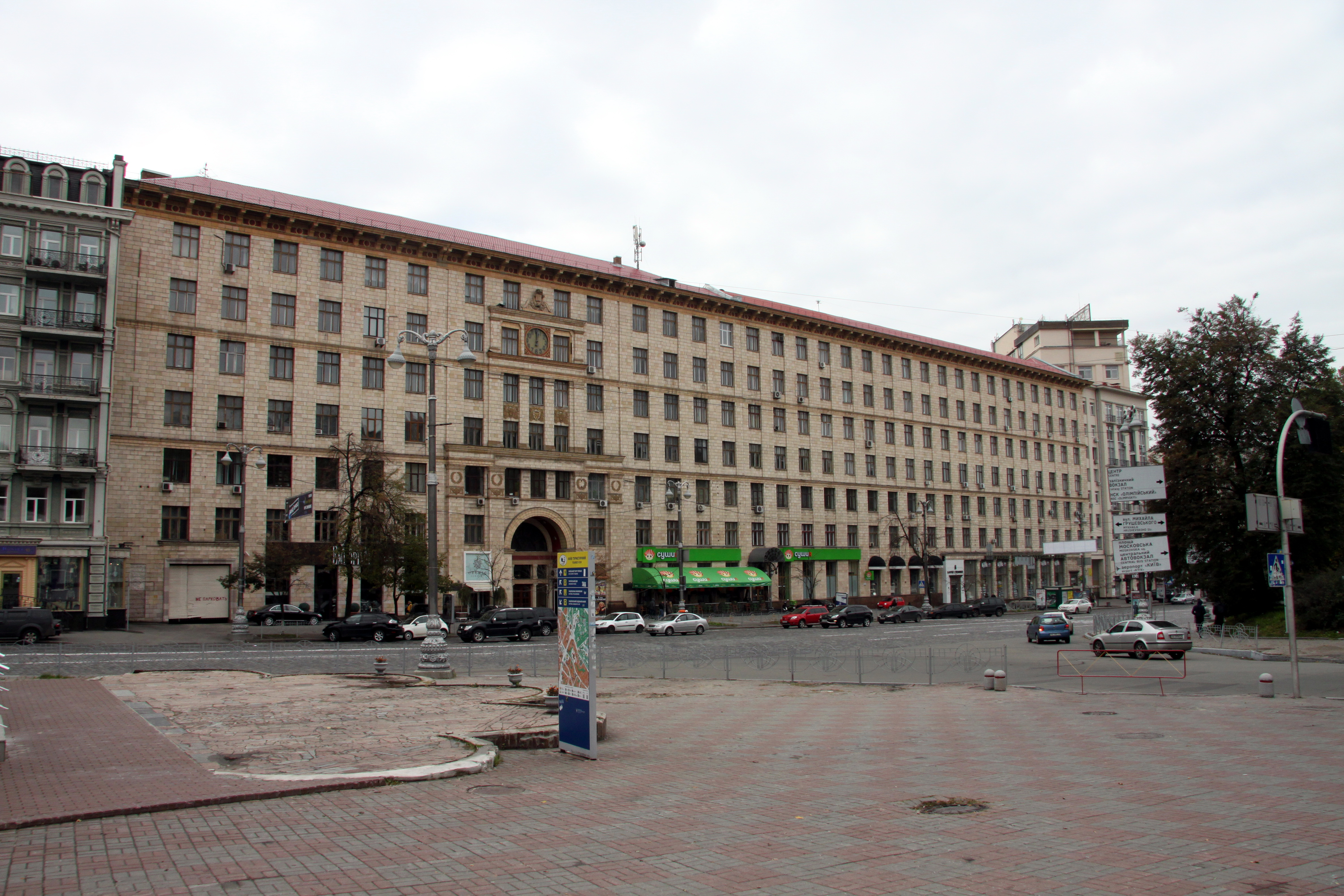
- The Institute's headquarters in Kyiv
- Established: 1991
- Director: Pavlo Hrytsenko
- Address: Hrushevsky Street 4
- Location: Kyiv, Ukraine
- Website: old.nas.gov.ua

The NASU Institute of the Ukrainian Language (Ukrainian: Інститут української мови, romanized: Instytut ukrainskoi movy) of the NAS of Ukraine is a research organization in Ukraine created to do thorough studying of the Ukrainian language. It is the Ukrainian coordinating centre of research issues for Ukrainian. An important function of the Institute is to consolidate the Ukrainian language as the country's official language. One of the institute's aims is to promote lingual harmony in present-day Ukraine.

The Institute was formed in 1991. Its headquarters is located at the Institute of History of Ukraine building on Hrushevsky Street, Kyiv. The director of the institute is Professor Pavlo Hrytsenko . Other key members of the organisation include Vasyl Nimchuk, Ivan Vyhovanets, and Svitlana Yermolenko.

== Core activities ==
The main activity of the NASU Institute of the Ukrainian Language is to research the Ukrainian language as a social, structural, historical, regional national-and-cultural phenomenon. Directions of the Ukrainian language investigations:

- social status, functions;
- structure of standard language system – vocabulary, grammar, standardization and codifications on every language level;
- social, professional and regional differentiation;
- origin traces and development history;
- contacts with other languages in different periods;
- forming and dynamics of Ukrainian onomastics;
- development of terminology subsystems.

A lot of institute projects were implemented in cooperation with specialists from other countries. Institute workers are studying the Ukrainian dialects within the international research project The Slavic Linguistic Atlas, collaborating with institutions of academies of all the Slavic countries and Germany. They also cooperate with scientists from European countries within a project «The Linguistic Atlas of Europe» (Prof. Pavlo Hrytsenko). Some research workers of the Institute were co-executors of a project by International Committee of Slavists «Najnowsze dzieje języków slowiańskich» (Opole, Poland). As a result is a research « Ukrainska mova 1945-1995» (1999) (Prof. Svitlana Yermolenko).

== Publishing ==
Another core activity is publishing of science and popular science periodicals:

- "Ukrainian language" (Ukrainian: Українська мова), a theoretical science journal for issue in all linguistic branches of Ukrainian language;
- "Culture of a word" (Ukrainian: Культура слова), a popular science journal for issues in language standardizations and stylistics;
- "Lexicography Bulletin" (Ukrainian: Лексикографічний бюлетень), a science journal for issues in lexicography and lexicology;
- "Studies in Onomastics and Etymology" (Ukrainian: Студії з ономастики та етимології), a proceeding for issues in onomastics and etymology;
- "Terminology Bulletin" (Ukrainian: Термінологічний вісник), a science journal for issues in terminology.
