= Igor V. Komarov =

Ukrainian Chemist

- Born: May 15, 1964 (age 62); Irkliiv, Ukraine
- Education: Taras Shevchenko National University of Kyiv
- Known for: Design, synthesis and study of model compounds, conformationally restricted and fluorine-containing amino acids and peptides, photocontrollable peptidomimetics
- Awards: Georg Forster research award
- Scientific career
- Fields: organic chemistry, medicinal chemistry, nanotechnology
- Workplaces: Institute of High Technologies, Taras Shevchenko National University of Kyiv
- Thesis: Design and synthesis of model compounds: study of stereoelectronic, steric effects, reactive intermediates, catalytic enantioselective hydrogenation and dynamic protection of functional groups
- Doctoral advisor: Prof. Mykhailo Kornilov

Igor Volodymyrovych Komarov (Ukrainian: Ігор Володимирович Комаров) is a Ukrainian synthetic organic chemist, specializing in medicinal chemistry and nanotechnology. He is the director of the Institute of High Technologies of Taras Shevchenko National University of Kyiv. He is also a scientific advisor of Enamine Ltd (Ukraine) and Lumobiotics GmbH (Germany).

== Career ==
Igor V. Komarov graduated with distinction from Taras Shevchenko National University of Kyiv, and started to work at the same university in 1986 first as an engineer. He obtained his Candidate of Sciences degree in 1991 in organic chemistry at Taras Shevchenko National University of Kyiv under supervision of Mikhail Yu. Kornilov; the candidate thesis was devoted to the use of lanthanide shift reagents in NMR spectroscopy. Afterwards, he was a postdoctoral fellow at the University Chemical Laboratory in Cambridge (1996–1997, United Kingdom) and at the Institut für Organische Katalyseforschung in Rostock (2000–2001, Germany). He holds the Supramolecular Chemistry Chair of Institute of High Technologies at Taras Shevchenko National University. Komarov earned his Doctor of Sciences degree in 2003; the title of his thesis is "Design and synthesis of model compounds: study of stereoelectronic, steric effects, reactive intermediates, catalytic enantioselective hydrogenation and dynamic protection of functional groups" He is also a scientific advisor for Enamine Ltd. and Lumobiotics GmbH. Igor V. Komarov was awarded the title of Professor in 2007.

== Contribution to research ==
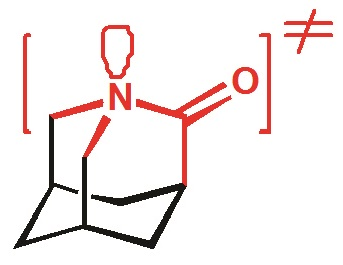
1-Aza-2-adamantanone – a model compound. The fragment which mimics the cis–trans amide isomerization transition state is shown in red

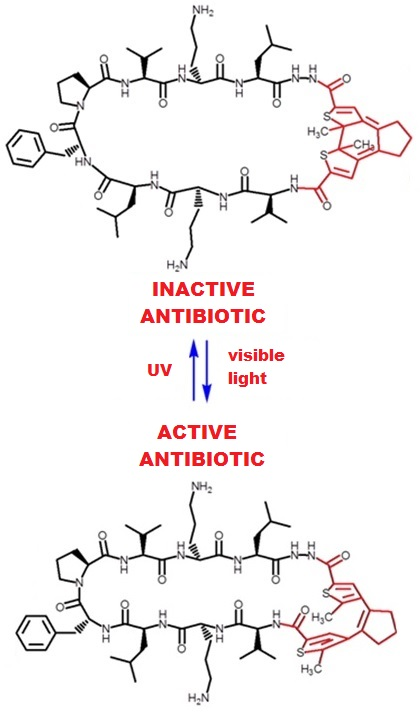
Photocontrollable antibiotic, an analogue of the natural antibiotic gramicidin S

The areas of scientific interests of Igor V. Komarov are medicinal chemistry and synthesis of model compounds, which can be used to obtain new knowledge in biochemistry, stereochemistry, theoretical chemistry, catalysis. Igor has over 125 peer reviewed research papers, h-index 31, has guided 8 PhD students to date. Igor's scientific group puts the main focus on developing of novel synthetic methods and design of theoretically interesting molecules, part of which were created and synthesized in tight collaboration with Prof. Anthony J. Kirby from the University of Cambridge (United Kingdom). One of such collaborative projects was synthesis, study of stereochemistry and chemical properties of 1-aza-2-adamantanone and its derivatives. A trimethyl-substituted derivative ("the most twisted amide", "Kirby's amide") was designed in the Prof. Kirby's laboratory and synthesized by Igor in 1997 during his postdoctoral stay in Cambridge. In 2014, a parent molecule was made in Igor's group in collaboration with Prof. Kirby. The compound modelled the transition state of cis-trans isomerization of amides and allowed obtaining fundamental knowledge about the amide bond.

Igor V. Komarov started his research in the area of synthetic organic chemistry at the beginning of 1990th, working on phosphorylation of aromatic heterocyclic compounds by phosphorus(V) acid halides. At that time, convenient phosphorylation methods were developed, which now find use, for example, for synthesis of materials applicable for uranium extraction. Later, working in Rostock, Igor V. Komarov changed the direction of his research and got interested in homogenous asymmetric catalysis. The study of catalysis was carried out using model compounds: functionalized camphor- and tartaric acid-derived chiral ligands were synthesized such as monophosphines, diphosphines, and then Rhodium(I) complexes with them. The complexes were used for asymmetric homogenous hydrogenation of prochiral substrates, and the obtained results allowed elucidating the effects of oxo- and oxy-functional groups in ligands on efficiency and selectivity of the catalysts. These works led to introduction of efficient catalysts to synthetic practice, like catASium, some of them bearing a camphor-derived ligand ROCKYPhos (named after the cities ROstock and KYiv).

Although Igor's interest to the synthesis of chiral ligands has not been faded, he changed the general direction of his research once more, and now he works in the area of drug design. One of the main design principle is restriction of conformational mobility of the drug candidate molecules. Prof. Komarov's research group developed many approaches to synthesis of conformationally restricted amines and amino acids - the building blocks for drug design. Numerous conformationally restricted fluorine-containing amino acids were also designed and synthesized, with a purpose of using them as labels to study peptides in lipid bilayers by solid-state NMR spectroscopy.

Igor V. Komarov's group made a contribution to design and synthesis of light-controllable biologically active compounds - photocontrollable peptides - potential candidates for photopharmacology drugs. Photopharmacology drugs can be administered in the inactive, non-toxic form, and then activated ("switched on") by light only when and where required to treat localized lesions (e.g.in solid tumors). The activation by light can be done with very high spatiotemporal precision in the lesion site, leaving the rest of the patient body unaffected. After the treatment, the photopharmacology drugs can be inactivated ("switched off") by light in order to diminish side effects and environmental burden.

Another research direction in the Igor V. Komarov's scientific group is navigation of chemical space. A method of structural comparison for organic molecules was developed which employed exit vector plot analysis. Enumeration of molecules (exhaustive generation of all theoretically possible structures) was carried out for some classes of organic compounds, for example, for conformationally restricted diamines.

In the area of nanotechnology, Igor V. Komarov's research group studied cell-penetrating peptides as carriers for carbon-based fluorescent nanoparticles, shuttling them inside eukaryotic cells with the purpose of bioimaging.

Igor V. Komarov has a Ukrainian patent, 2 international patents, is a co-author of text-books on NMR spectroscopy.

== Scientific projects ==
Igor V. Komarov was a coordinator of scientific projects financed by the Ministry of Education and Science of Ukraine (three applied projects devoted to design of therapeutic peptides, including photocontrolled [1]), Alexander von Humboldt Foundation (Institute Partnershaft and Research Linkage Programs, in collaboration with the University of Karlsruhe (Karlsruhe, Germany)[2] and Leibniz Institute of Molecular Pharmacology (Berlin, Germany)[3]), private companies Degussa (the project was devoted to development of large-scale production of a ligand for Rhodium-based catalysts of asymmetric hydrogenation) and Enamine (six medicinal chemistry projects, lead discovery and lead optimization). He is currently a coordinator of a European Horizon 2020 Research and Innovation Staff Exchange (RISE) Programme (2016–2019) Grant Agreement number: 690973 [4], the title of the project – “Peptidomimetics with Photocontrolled Biological Activity”.

== Awards and grants ==
- NATO Research Award (postdoctoral fellowship, 01.1996–01.1997, The University of Cambridge, United Kingdom);
- INTAS grants (research visits, 08.1993 and 10.1994, The University of Cambridge, United Kingdom);
- ISF grants (1998, research project, Taras Shevchenko National University of Kyiv);
- Grants of the Royal Society of Chemistry for authors (1999, 2000);
- Alexander von Humboldt Research Fellowship (postdoctoral stay in Rostock, Germany, 2000–2001);
- Georg Forster Research Award (2015);
- Title "Merited Figure of Science and Technology of Ukraine" (2016).
