= Semen Appatov =

Ukrainian political scientist and historian

Semyon Iosifovich Appatov
- Born: Semyon Iosifovich Appatov; January 24, 1930; Pervomaisk, Ukraine
- Died: March 26, 2003 (aged 73); Cincinnati, Ohio, US
- Education: Taras Shevchenko National University of Kyiv
- Known for: Founding the Odesa school of international relations studies
- Awards: Honored Science and Technology Figure of Ukraine (1993)
- Scientific career
- Thesis: American historiography of US policy in Germany and the German question after World War II (1966)
- Doctoral advisor: K. D. Petryaev
- Notable students: I. M. Koval

Semen Yosypovich Appatov (January 24, 1930 – March 26, 2003) was a Ukrainian historian and political scientist who specialized in international relations, American foreign policy historiography, and European security dynamics. Doctor of historical sciences (1981), professor (1982), Honored Science and Technology Figure of Ukraine (1993), member of the National Union of Journalists of Ukraine (1964).

== Biography ==
He was born on January 24, 1930, in the city of Pervomaisk, Mykolaiv Oblast, in the family of a doctor. During the war, his father fought, and S. Y. Appatov and his mother were evacuated in the city of Irbit, Sverdlovsk Oblast. After the liberation of Odesa from the invaders, he returned to the city.

He graduated from Odesa Secondary School No. 50 with a gold medal in 1947 and entered Taras Shevchenko National University of Kyiv at the Faculty of International Relations. In 1952, he graduated from the university, having received a diploma with honors and the specialty of historian-internationalist, referent-translator. After that he returned to Odesa.

He worked as a lecturer at the "Knowledge" society (1952–1954). He studied at the Odesa Pedagogical Institute of Foreign Languages (1956–1960). At the same time, he worked in the Odesa Regional Committee of the Trade Union of Education Workers (1954–1958). He taught history and economic geography in English at the Odesa special boarding school No. 2 and was a teacher and director of the Odesa three-year foreign language courses (1958–1966), taught the history of international relations and foreign policy of the USSR at the Evening University of Marxism–Leninism (1961–1966).

== Academic career ==
Appatov defended his kandidat dissertation in 1966 at the Moscow State Institute of International Relations, writing on American historiography of US policy in Germany. His supervisor was Professor K. D. Petryaev. In the same year he joined Odesa I.I. Mechnikov State University as a senior lecturer and was promoted to docent (associate professor) in 1967. He earned his doctoral degree in 1980 from the Institute of General History of the Academy of Sciences of the USSR and took over as head of the Department of Modern and Contemporary History.

In June 1992 he co-founded the Center for International Studies at the university and ran it as director until 1999. A separate Department of International Relations was set up in 1996 with Appatov as its first head; he led it until April 1999. Under his leadership the university developed into a recognized center for the study of international relations and foreign-policy analysis in Ukraine.

Appatov moved to the United States in 1999. He died in Cincinnati, Ohio, on March 26, 2003.

== Research activities ==
His main research interests are the study of foreign policy of the United States and its concepts, political science and world-systems theory. For the first time in Ukraine, back in Soviet times, S. Appatov transferred the study of the historiography of US politics from the plane of propaganda criticism to the plane of scientific analysis, and also devoted himself to the study of the process of formation of Ukraine's national interests on the international arena, the relations of the young state with the leading countries of the world.

In 1986, as part of the Fulbright Program, he lectured on Soviet-American relations at the University of Pennsylvania and Tufts University. He also took part in conferences at Harvard University and at universities in New York City and Washington. That same year he became a member of the American Association for the Advancement of Science.

In 1999, together with David Albright, he co-edited and published Ukraine and European Security, a volume bringing together views of North American, Western European, and Ukrainian security analysts on European security issues.

== Selected publications ==
- Американская историография германской проблемы и политика США в Германии [American historiography of the German question and US policy in Germany]. Moscow: Международные отношения, 1966.
- США и Европа: общие проблемы американской континентальной политики [The USA and Europe: general problems of American continental policy]. Moscow: Мысль, 1979.
- Критический анализ американской историографии [Critical analysis of American historiography] (co-author). Kyiv, 1984.
- США: современная внешнеполитическая мысль [The USA: contemporary foreign policy thought] (co-author). Odesa, 1992.
- Albright, David; Appatov, Semyen J. (1999). Ukraine and European Security. London: Palgrave Macmillan. ISBN 978-0-333-72711-9.

== See also ==
- National Academy of Sciences of Ukraine
- National Union of Journalists of Ukraine
- American Association for the Advancement of Science
- Members of the National Academy of Sciences of Ukraine
