= Taras Shevchenko National University of Kyiv =

Public university in Kyiv, Ukraine

Coordinates: 50°26′30.85″N 30°30′40.73″E

- Київський національний університет імені Тараса Шевченка
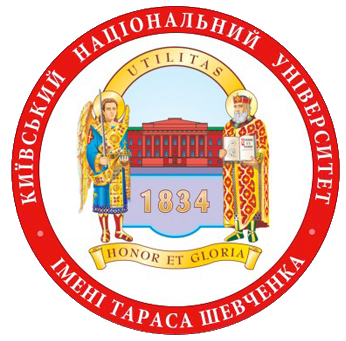
- University seal
- Other names: Imperial University of Kyiv named after Saint Vladimir (1833-1920); University of Kyiv n. a. Mykhailo Drahomanov (1920–32); University of Kyiv (1932–39)
- Motto: Utilitas honor et gloria (Latin)
- Motto in English: Utility Honor and Glory
- Type: Public, national
- Established: November 8, 1833; 193 years ago
- Founder: Nicholas I of Russia
- Affiliations: Ministry of Education and Science of Ukraine
- Academic affiliations: IAU, EUA
- Rector: Valeriy Kopiyka
- Students: <30,000
- Location: Kyiv, Ukraine
- Campus: Urban
Colors
- Website: knu.ua
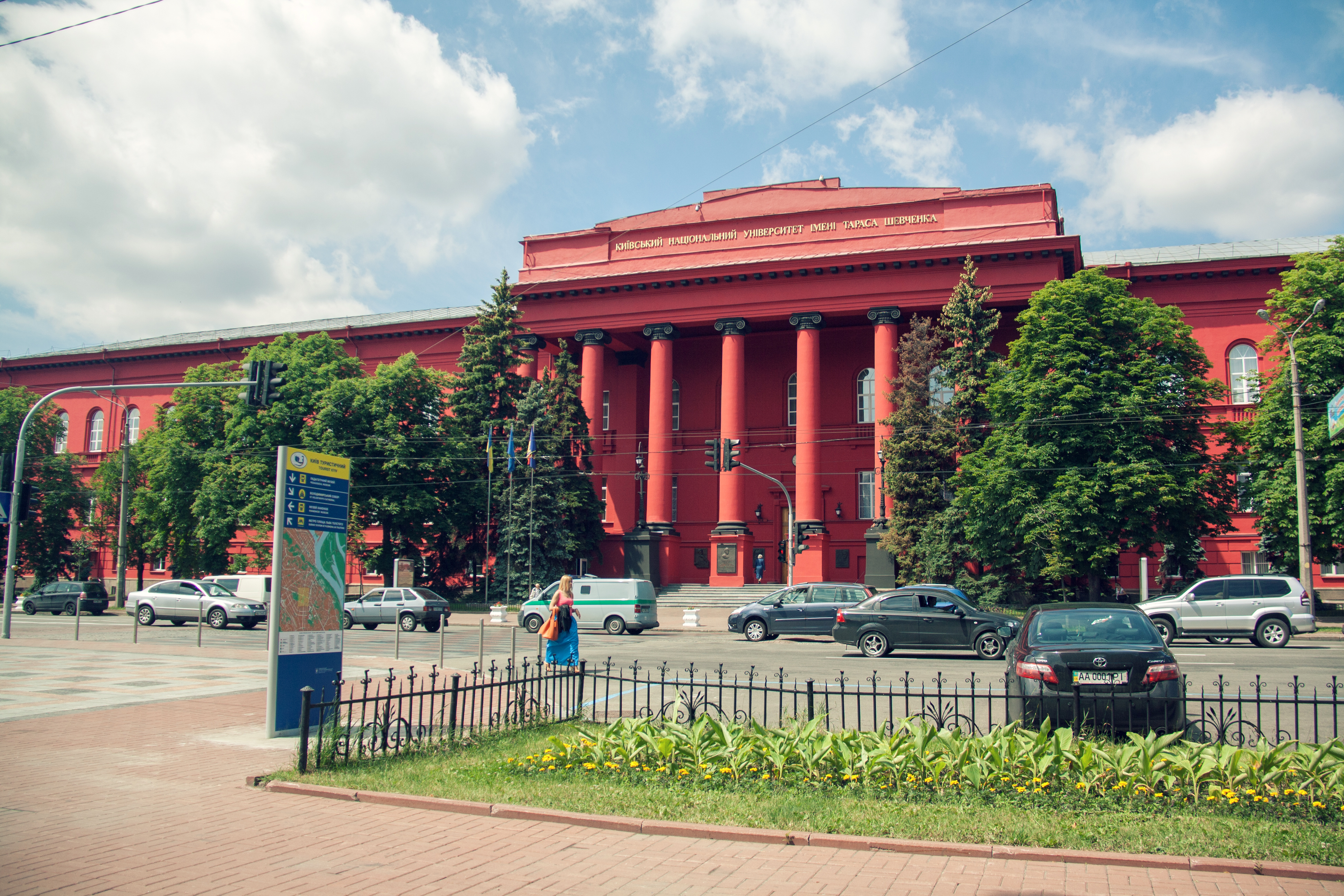

Immovable Monument of National Significance of Ukraine
- Official name: Комплекс споруд Національного університету імені Тараса Шевченка (Complex of buildings of the Taras Shevchenko National University)
- Type: History
- Reference no.: 260016-Н

The Taras Shevchenko National University of Kyiv (Ukrainian: Київський національний університет імені Тараса Шевченка, romanized: Kyivskyi natsionalnyi universytet imeni Tarasa Shevchenka; also known as Kyiv University, Shevchenko University, or KNU) is a public university in Kyiv, Ukraine. The third-oldest university in Ukraine after the University of Lviv and the University of Kharkiv, it was founded in 1834 by Nicholas I of Russia as the Saint Vladimir Imperial University of Kiev and it has since changed its name several times. Its structure consists of 15 faculties and five institutes.

During the Soviet Union era, Kiev State University was one of the top three universities in the USSR, along with Moscow State University and Leningrad State University. It is ranked as the best university in Ukraine in many rankings. Its alumni include Mykola Lysenko, Nikolay Bunge, Mykhailo Drahomanov, Mykhailo Hrushevskyi, Nikolai Berdyaev, Mikhail Bulgakov, Ivan Schmalhausen, Theodosius Dobzhansky, Viacheslav Chornovil, and Leonid Kravchuk. The university is named after Taras Shevchenko, who was banned from educational activities for political reasons, but worked for the university as a field researcher.

== The university today ==
Taras Shevchenko University is named after Taras Shevchenko, a major figure in Ukrainian literature and art. The university trains specialists in many fields of knowledge and carries out research. It is considered the most prestigious university in Ukraine and a major centre of advanced learning and progressive thinking. It consists of more faculties and departments, and trains specialists in a greater number of academic fields than any other Ukrainian educational institution.

The university is a major centre of learning and research and an important cultural centre. Student numbers total about 30,000 students.

== History ==
=== Saint Vladimir Imperial University of Kiev ===
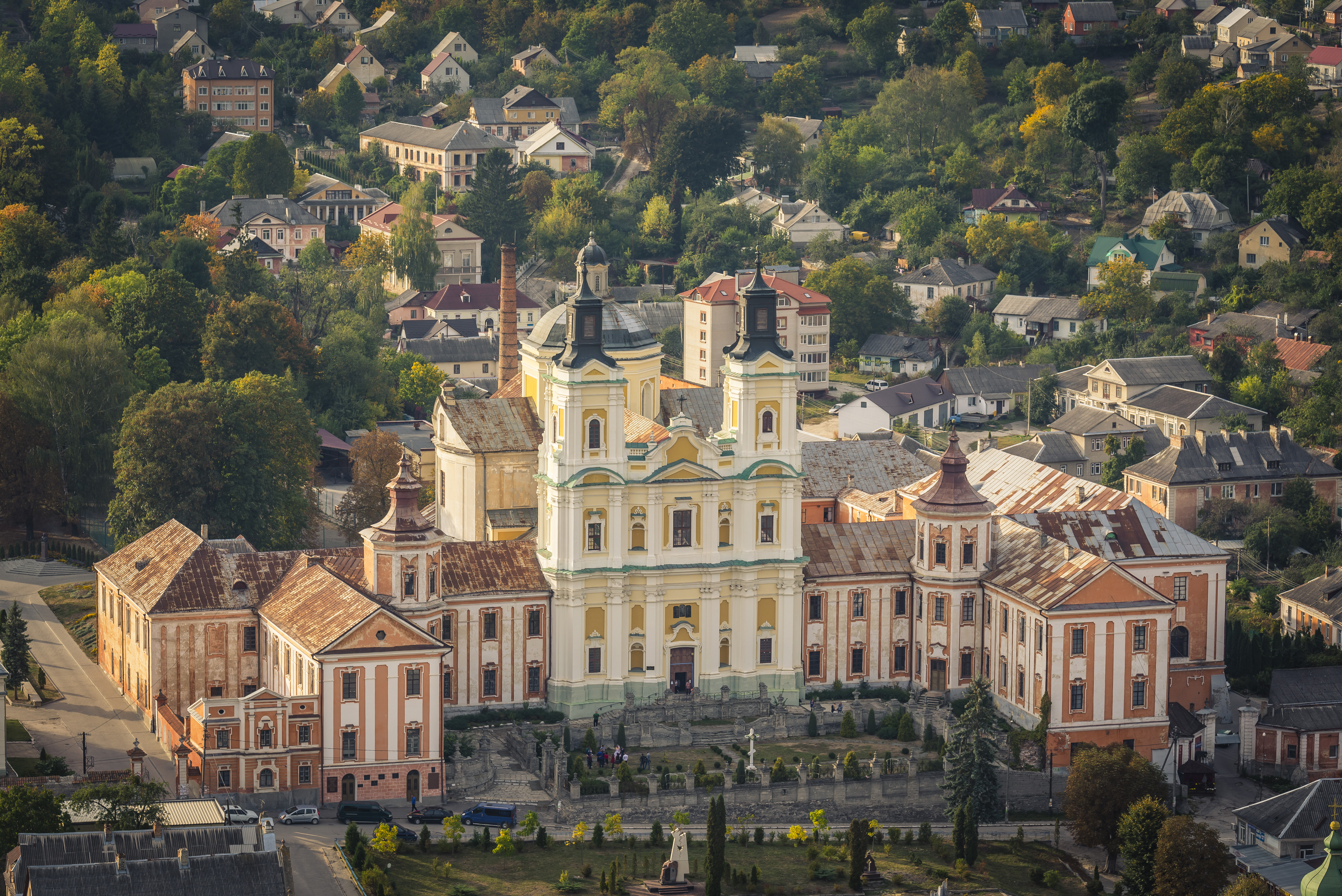
Main building of the Kremenets lyceum, from which the library and early professors of KNU came after it was closed in 1831

Saint Vladimir Imperial University of Kiev was founded in 1834 by Nicholas I of Russia (r. 1825–1855), and was named after Vladimir the Great, the 10/11th century ruler of Kievan Rus'. The university's name was chosen by the authorities of the Russian Empire, where the role of Orthodox Christianity was immense; the choice of name was a reflection of Kiev as the cradle of Eastern Christianity for the Empire.

The university benefited from assets transferred from Vilnius University and a lyceum in Kremenets (Volhynian Governorate, today Western Ukraine), which was closed in the aftermath of the November Uprising of 1830. The first 62 students started their studies at the university in 1834, in its one faculty, the Faculty of Philosophy, which had two departments: the Department of History and Philology and the Department of Physics and Mathematics. There were new additions to the original department in 1835 and 1847: the Faculty of Law and the Faculty of Medicine. Later on, the original Faculty of Philosophy was divided into two separate units: the Faculty of History and Philology and the Faculty of Natural Sciences. There were no more additions to the number of departments until the 1920s.

An early 20th-century Russian postcard picturing Saint Vladimir University in Kyiv.

The walls of the main building are painted in red while the tops and bottoms of its columns are painted black. Ukrainian composer Mykola Leontovych's "Shchedryk" was premiered at the Kiev University on December 26, 1916, by the university's choir directed by Oleksandr Koshyts.

=== Mykhailo Drahomanov University (1920–1932) ===
In 1920, Saint Vladimir University was renamed as Mykhailo Drahomanov University.

=== Taras Shevchenko University (from 1939) ===
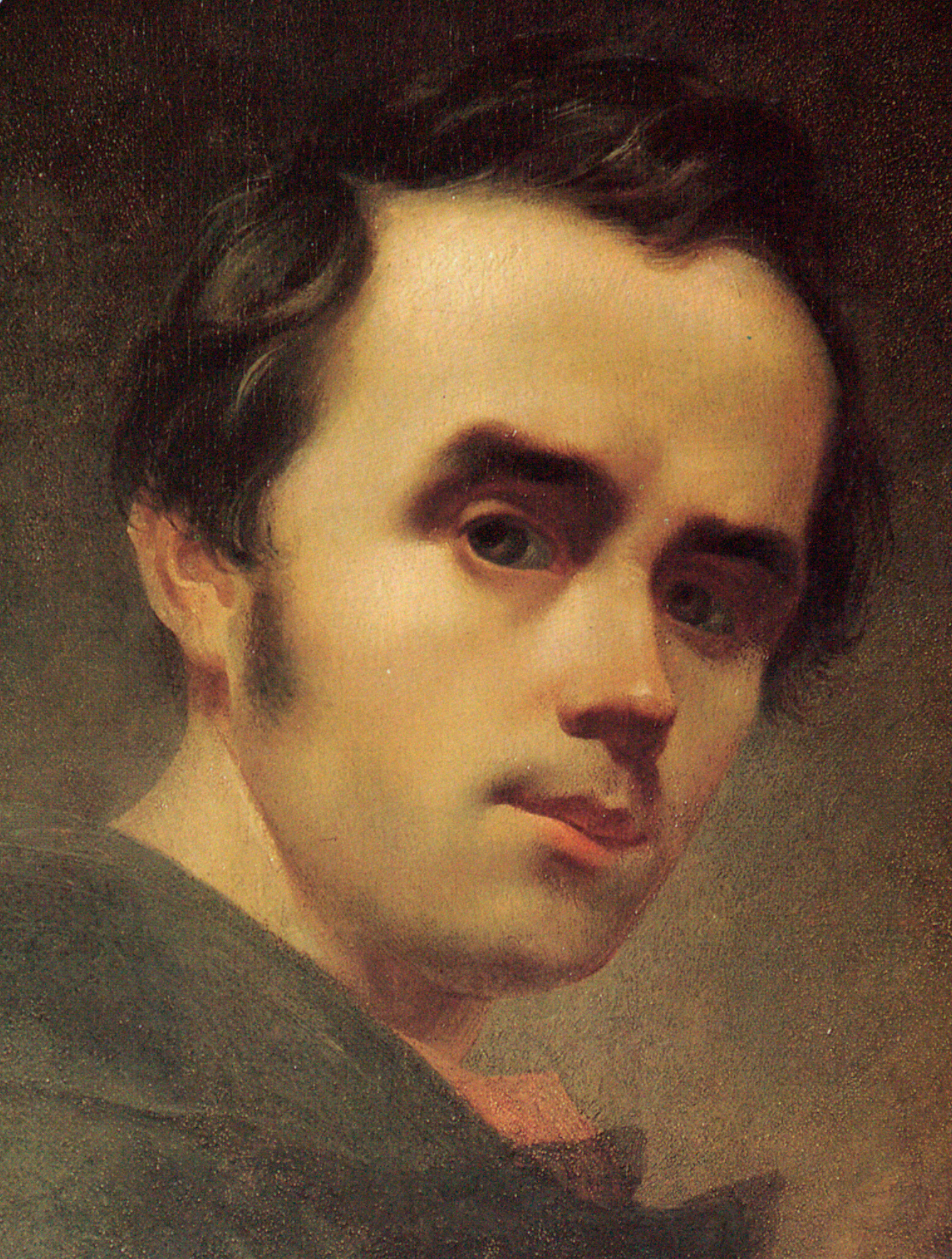
Taras Shevchenko's self portrait, 1840/1841

In 1939, the university was renamed after Ukrainian national bard Taras Shevchenko, who had also been briefly employed by the university between 1845 and 1846.

During the German–Soviet war, the university was evacuated to the city of Kyzylorda in Kazakhstan, where it merged with the National University of Kharkiv to form the United Ukrainian State University. After the liberation of Kyiv in 1943, the university returned to its original location. Students and lecturers rebuilt the Humanities and Chemistry buildings and by 15 January 1944, classes resumed for senior undergraduates and for first-years on 1 February.

Since 1960, when the first international students were admitted, over 20,000 highly qualified specialists have been trained at Taras Shevchenko University for 120 countries. The first foreign students of the Taras Shevchenko University came from Cuba, Guinea, Indonesia, Ghana, Togo, Nigeria, Cameroon, Benin, Zanzibar, Yemen, Algeria, Namibia and Afghanistan. They continued on to become doctors, engineers, agriculturists, diplomats, economists, and statesmen in their respective countries.

During the Soviet period, the Taras Shevchenko University received one Order of Lenin (1959) and one Order of the October Revolution (1984). Additionally, in 2002 the asteroid 4868 Knushevia was named in honour of Kyiv Taras Shevchenko University.

During the Russo-Ukrainian war, several buildings of the university's Institutes of International Relations and Journalism were damaged in a Russian drone attack on 3 November 2024.

== Rankings and partnerships ==
=== University rankings ===
University rankings

Global – Overall
- QS World: 721-730 (2026)
- THE World: 1001+

Regional – Overall
- QS Emerging Europe and Central Asia: 35 (2022)

Between 2014 and 2017 the university was ranked within top 650 universities in the world according to QS World University Rankings. In 2009, Delovoy magazine ranked Taras Shevchenko University as the best university in Ukraine, being nationally the strongest in the greatest number of academic fields. According to the independent ranking of 228 universities in Ukraine performed by Compas, Taras Shevchenko University was ranked the first best position in Ukraine regarding the adequacy of alumni to the labor market of Ukraine. According to Scopus (2009), Taras Shevchenko University has the highest research paper output of any Ukrainian university, and is also the top research producer (as assessed by total paper citation count). The university features in the Webometrics Ranking of World Universities (2010) at 1,110 out of 8,000 in the world, at 63 out of top 100 universities of the Central and Eastern Europe, and the leading academic institution in Ukraine.

=== Foreign partner universities ===
The university has over 400 partner universities, currently maintains relations and, in some cases, student exchange programs with universities of forty countries; a figure which includes a number of former republics of the Soviet Union and other countries which Ukraine traditionally, over the past 70 years prior to independence in 1991, did not have official bilateral relations with. A small selection of partner universities is displayed below.

Country	University	Country	University
Armenia	Yerevan State University	Greece	National and Kapodistrian University of Athens Aristotle University of Thessaloniki
Azerbaijan	Baku State University	Italy	University of Florence University of Macerata
Belarus	Belarusian State University	Japan	Ryukoku University Aoyama Gakuin University
Belgium	University of Liège	South Korea	Wonkwang University
Canada	University of Manitoba	Poland	University of Warsaw
China	Peking University Wuhan University	Russia	Moscow State University
Czech Republic	Charles University in Prague Masaryk University	Spain	University of Valencia
France	Panthéon-Assas University	United Kingdom	University of Leeds
Germany	LMU Munich Free University of Berlin	United States	Rutgers University University of Pittsburgh

And others like Carinthia University of Applied Sciences, Lithuanian University of Educational Sciences, Vidzeme University of Applied Sciences, ADA University etc...

== Organisation and administration ==
=== Schools / Faculties ===
These are the 14 faculties and 6 institutes into which the university is divided:

- Faculty of Chemistry
- Faculty of Computer Science and Cybernetics
- Faculty of Geography
- Institute of Geology
- Faculty of Economics
- Faculty of Information Technologies
- Faculty of History
- Faculty of Mechanics and Mathematics
- Faculty of Philosophy
- Faculty of Physics
- Faculty of Radio Physics, Electronics and Computer Systems
- Faculty of Psychology
- Faculty of Sociology
- Preparation Faculty
- Institute of Law
- Institute of Philology
- Institute of Journalism
- Institute of International Relations
- Institute of Public Affairs and Civil Service
- Military Institute
- Institute of Postgraduate Education
- Institute of High Technologies
- Institute of Biology and Medicine

=== Other institutes ===
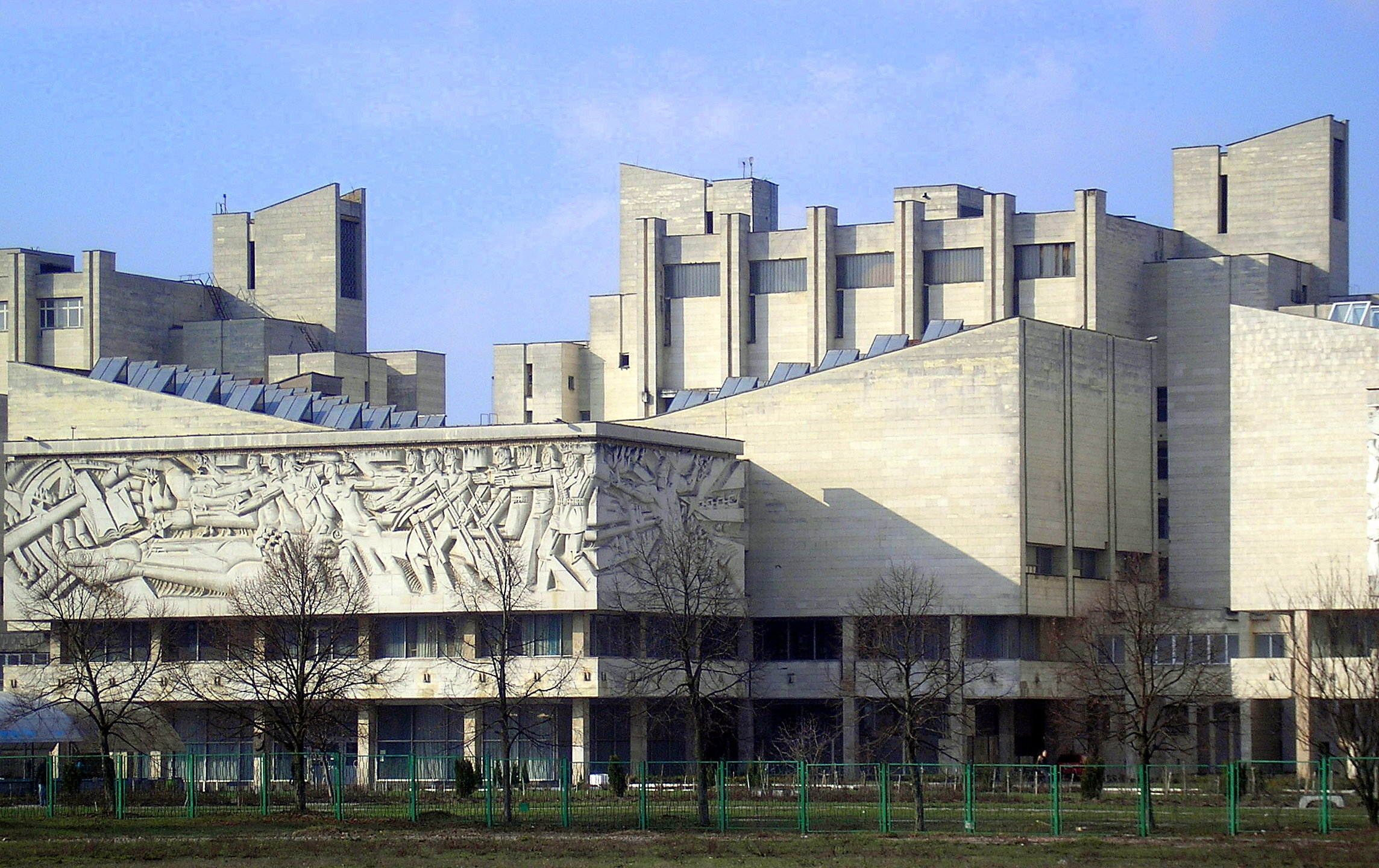
The cybernetics faculty of KNU, located at Vystavkovyi Tsentr metro station

- Astronomical Observatory of the Taras Shevchenko University (in Ukrainian)
- Ukrainian Humanitarian Lyceum (in Ukrainian)
- Center of Ukrainian Studies
- Information & Computer Centre of the Taras Shevchenko University (in Ukrainian)
- Kaniv Natural Reserved Park of the Taras Shevchenko University (in Ukrainian)
- KNU Open University – Online study programs
- Maksymovych Scientific Library
- Regional Cisco Networking Academy (in Ukrainian)
- Science Park Taras Shevchenko University of Kyiv
- Scientific and Research Department of the Taras Shevchenko University (in Ukrainian)
- Ukrainian Physico-Mathematical Lyceum (in Ukrainian)
- University Botanic Garden named after Academic O. Fomin
- Dnipro Choir

== Campus ==
After its initial establishment the university was located in private rooms in Pechersk, and was named for St. Vladimir. Now the main building (built 1837–42 by architect V I Beretti) can be found at 60 Volodymyrska Street, whilst a number of humanities departments are located at 14 Shevchenko Boulevard 14 (formerly the First Kyiv Gymnasium). Furthermore, there are departments located on Akademika Hlushkova Avenue (building 6, built 1954–70) and Vasylkivska Street (Library is located in building No. 90, built in 1939). The university's administration is housed in buildings 58–64 on Volodymyrska Street.

=== Red University Building ===
It was constructed from 1837 to 1843 and was built in the late Russian Classicism style, by a Russian architect of Italian descent, Vincent I. Beretti. The building forms an enormous square enclosing a courtyard; the length of the main façade is 145.68m. The walls of the building are painted blood red and the capitals and bases of the portico's columns are painted black, corresponding to the colours of the ribbon of the Order of St. Vladimir (founded in 1782), as Kyiv University used to bear the name of this Order. The motto of the Order, "Benefit, honor and glory" (Pol'za Chest' i Slava) also, subsequently, became the motto of Kyiv University. Local tour guides sometime state that Tsar Nicholas I ordered the entire main building painted red in response to student conscription protests during World War I to remind students of blood spilled by Ukrainian soldiers. The legend does not reflect the historical fact, as the building was painted red before World War I, in 1842. Nicholas I of Russia (1825–1855) died long before World War I (1914–1918). Built at the top of a hill, this building has significantly influenced Kyiv's architectural layout in the 19th century.

=== Botanical Gardens ===
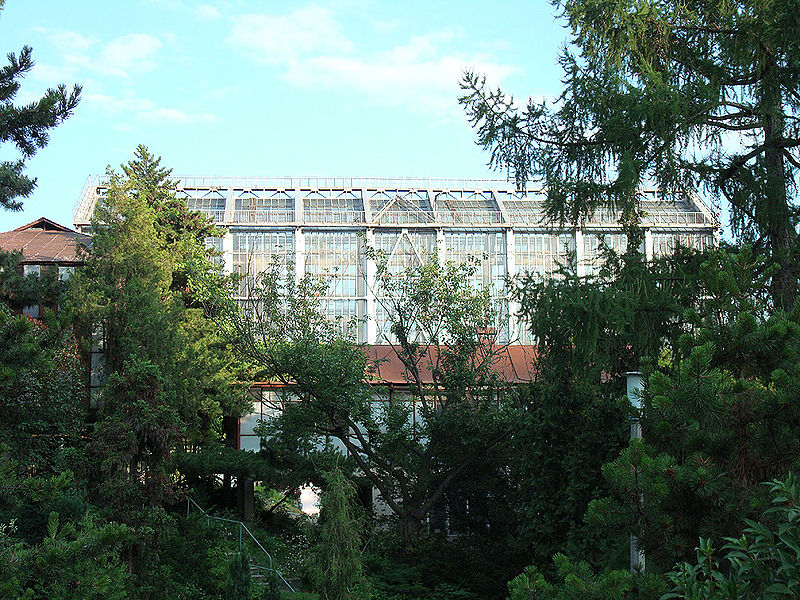
The botanical garden's greenhouse.

The university's A.V. Fomin Botanical Garden (named after Academician Aleksandr V. Fomin, 1869–1935) was founded in 1839 and planned by architect V. Beretti and botanist R. E. Trautfetterom. The total area covered by the garden is around 5.22 hectares; it has a collection of over 10 000 species, forms and varieties of plants. The garden's greenhouse's height, after reconstruction in 1977, is about 33 meters and is the largest in the world. The university's first orangerie was built in 1846-49 for its collection of tropical and subtropical plants; a collection which has now over two thousand items and is one of the largest in Europe. The gardens are located at the city centre campus, to the rear of the red building; the nearest metro station is Universytet.

=== Yellow Building and Maksymovych Library ===
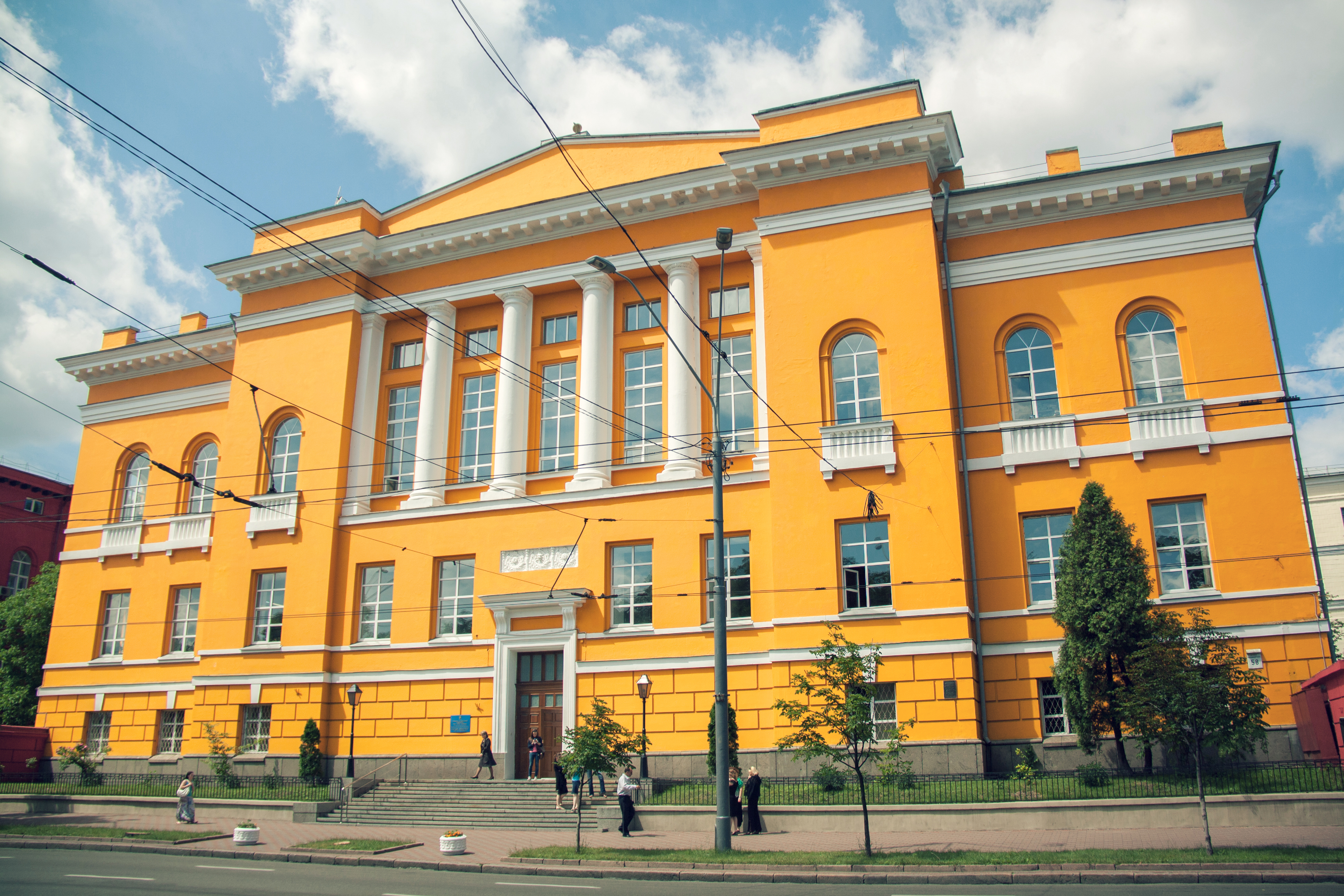
The university library, part of the city centre campus

The Humanities Building or "Yellow" building of the university is located at 14 Shevchenko boulevard. Built in 1850–1852, it was designed in the classical style by the architect Alexander Vikentiyovych Beretti (1816–95), son of V. Beretti, the architect of by the main ("red") building. The building initially belonged to the First Gymnasium (a grammar school, in which M. Berlin and M. Kostomarov taught, and where students included the artists Nikolai Ge and V. Levandovskyy, historian M. Zakrevskii, economist M. Bunge, poet M. Herbel, sculptor P. Zabello, writers Bulgakov and K. Paustovsky, and future academics E. Tarle, A. Bogomolets, and A. Lunacharsky). In 1919 the academic Vernadsky, first president of the Academy of Sciences of Ukraine, took up residence in part of the building. Since 1959, the building has been part of the Kyiv National University.

The Maksymovych Library (58 Volodymyrska Street), built in 1939–1940, is a neo-classical building designed by architects V. A. Osmaka and P. Alyoshin as the university's Humanities building. Currently the library holds around 3.5 million books, making it currently the largest research library in Ukraine. The Maksymovych library – along with the No.1 branch of the National Library of Ukraine (62 Volodymyrska Street), designed by the same architects in 1929–1930, and the main ("red") building of the university – forms part of an important and impressive architectural ensemble which is today considered one of Kyiv's key collective architectural monuments.

=== Architecture ===
In the 1960s it became imperative that the Kyiv National University acquire more space for its greatly expanded number of departments. It was with this in mind that the building of a complex of new buildings for the university started on the southwestern outskirts of Kyiv (opposite the National Exhibition Centre of Ukraine). The authors of the final project were architects V. I. Ladnyi, M. P. Budylovskyi, V. I. Kolomiets and engineer V. Y. Drizo.

The Institute of International Relations and Institute of Journalism's joint building at 36 Melnikova Street, developed by Kyivproect architects O Nosenko, I Shpara, Yu Duhovichny, O Klishchuk and Y Vig, was awarded the State Prize of Ukraine in the Field of Architecture in 1995.

=== Astronomical Observatory ===
The astronomical observatory of Kyiv National University is located at 3 Observatorna Street; founded in 1845, it was initially planned to place an observatory in the Main Building of the university (as evidenced by existing architectural designs for the red building), however, it was later decided to build for a separate building to house the observatory. This task was again entrusted Vincenty Beretta, it was built in 1841–1845 and officially opened on February 7, 1845.

=== Accreditation Of Taras Shevchenko National University of Kyiv ===
- World Health Organization
- Ministry of Education and Science of Ukraine
- Medical Council of India

== Notable alumni ==
- Iryna Bekeshkina (1952–2020), sociologist and political scholar.
- Sofia Berezanska (1924–2024), archaeologist who graduated from the Faculty of History with honours in 1948.
- Yusif Vazir Chamanzaminli (1887–1943), Azerbaijani writer, first Ambassador of Azerbaijan Democratic Republic to Ukraine and Turkey (1919–1920); graduated from the Law Faculty, where a Hall was named after him in 2022.
- Yurii Chekan (born 1960), musicologist, member of the National Union of Composers of Ukraine.
- Valentyna Davydenko (born 1955), journalist, poet and artist
- Theodosius Dobzhansky (1900–1975) - Ukrainian-American geneticist and evolutionary biologist.
- Lidiia Dunayevska (1948–2006), folklorist, professor
- Tetiana Dziuba (born 1966), poet
- Olena Golub (born 1951), artist, art historian and writer
- Nataliya Gumenyuk (born 1983), journalist, teacher
- Halyna Hai (1956–2021), Ukrainian poet and writer
- Wladimir Klitschko (born 1976), former boxing world champion.
- Vitaly Klitschko (born 1971), former boxing world champion, Mayor of Kyiv since 2014.
- Igor Volodymyrovych Komarov (born 1964), director of the Institute of High Technologies of Taras Shevchenko National University of Kyiv
- Sonya Koshkina (born 1985), journalist, editor-in-chief of LB.ua
- Andriy Kozhemiakin (born 1965), politician and former security service officer
- Zinaida Kubar (born 1975), artist and fashion designer
- Dmytro Kuleba (born 1981), Ukrainian Foreign Minister
- Svitlana Kyrychenko (1935–2016), human rights activist
- Lidia Lykhach (born 1961), publisher and art curator
- Le Thi Tuyet Mai (born 1967), Ambassador and Permanent Representative of the Permanent Mission of Viet Nam to the United Nations Office and the World Trade Organization
- Oleksandra Matviichuk (born 1983), human rights activist and lawyer
- Gennadi Milinevsky (born 1951), atmosphere scientist
- Mikhail Morgulis (1941–2021), Russian-language writer, editor and theologian
- Gazanfar Musabeyov (1888–1938), Chairman of the Central Executive Committee of the Azerbaijan SSR (1929–1931), graduated from the Medical Faculty in 1917
- Yuriy Mushketyk (1929–2019), writer and journalist
- Igor Newerly (1903–1987), Polish-language novelist and educator
- Borys Oliynyk (1935–2017), Ukrainian poet, translator and political activist
- Lyudmila Pavlychenko (1916–1974), Red Army servicewoman during World War II, one of top snipers of all time
- Solomiia Pavlychko (1958–1999), literary critic, philosopher, feminist, translator
- Tetiana Podchasova (born 1940), economist-cyberneticist, computer scientist
- Myroslav Popovych (1930–2018), philosopher
- Kateryna Rashevska (born 1997), lawyer and human rights activist
- Yuriy Rybchynskyi (born 1945), poet and playwright
- Maksym Strikha (born 1961), translator and writer
- Oleksandr Tkachenko (born 1966), Ukraine's Minister of Culture and Information Policy (2020–2023)
- Anastasiia Tsybuliak (born 1984), eco-activist, scientist
- Maryna Viazovska (born 1984), Ukrainian Mathematician who solved the sphere-packing problem in dimension 8
- Iosif Vitebskiy (1938–2024), épée fencer, Soviet Ukrainian Olympic medalist and world champion and fencing coach
- Makarov Yuriy Volodymyrovych (born 1955), journalist, documentarian
- Leonid Vysheslavsky (1914–2002), poet, literary critic, translator
- Bolesław Woytowicz (1899–1980), Polish pianist and composer
- Tetiana Yakovenko (born 1954), poet, literary critic, teacher
- Svetlana Yeremenko (born 1959), journalist
- Oksana Zabuzhko (born 1960), poet and novelist
- Semen Yosypovych Appatov (1930–2003), historian
- Zofia Sara Syrkin-Binsztejnowa (1891–1943), Polish-Jewish doctor and social activist
- Oleksandr Hrytsenko (1967-2020), poet, translator and culturologist

=== Heads of state, government and international organisations ===
State/Government	Name	Office
Ukraine	Leonid Kravchuk	First post-independence President of Ukraine (1991–1994)
Ukraine	Petro Poroshenko	President of Ukraine (2014–2019)
Ukrainian People's Republic	Mykhailo Hrushevsky	President of the Central Rada of the Ukrainian People's Republic (1917–1918)
Ukrainian People's Republic	Volodymyr Vynnychenko	First Prime Minister of the Ukrainian People's Republic (1917–1918) and first Chairman of the Directorate of Ukraine (1918–1919)
Georgia	Mikheil Saakashvili	Twice President of Georgia (2004–2008 and 2008–2013) and Rose Revolution leader
Lithuania	Antanas Merkys	Last Prime Minister of independent Lithuania (1939–1940)
Israel	Yitzhak Ben-Zvi	Second President of Israel (1952–1963)
Byelorussian SSR	Yakov Gamarnik	First Secretary of the Byelorussian Communist Party (1928–1929)
Ukrainian SSR	Valentyna Shevchenko	Chairman of the Presidium of Supreme Soviet of the Ukrainian SSR (1985–1990)
UN	Hennadiy Udovenko	President of the United Nations General Assembly (1997–1998)
Russian Empire	Nikolay Bunge	Chairman of the Cabinet of Ministers (1887–1895)
Kenya	Amina Mohamed	Deputy Executive Director of the UNEP, Cabinet Secretary for Foreign Affairs of Kenya (2013–2018)

== See also ==
- 4868 Knushevia – asteroid named after the university
- List of universities in Ukraine
