= Gennadi Milinevsky =

Ukrainian atmosphere scientist

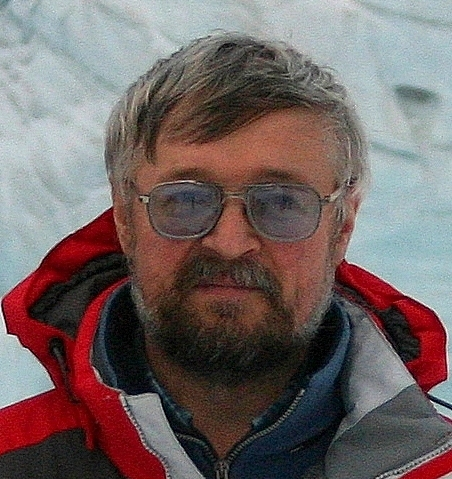
- Born: April 30, 1951 (age 75)
- Occupation: Atmosphere scientist
- Awards: Medal for Service III Stage, President of Ukraine (1998); Fedorov Award in Astronomy, Ukraine National Academy of Sciences (2021); Medal for Service II Stage, President of Ukraine (2021)

Academic background
- Education: Master of Science; Candidate Degree; Doctor of Science Degree
- Alma mater: Kyiv State University; Taras Shevchenko National University of Kyiv
- Thesis: Interaction of artificial gas-plasma formations with the Earth atmosphere (2001)

Gennadi Milinevsky is a Ukrainian atmosphere scientist and a professor of physics and mathematics at Taras Shevchenko National University of Kyiv (KNU). He is a professor at the International Center for Future Science within the College of Physics at Jilin University (JLU) and holds a position as principal scientist at the Main Astronomical Observatory of the National Academy of Sciences of Ukraine (NAS).

Milinevsky's primary research interest lies in atmospheric studies, particularly focusing on climate change processes and their effects on ecosystems. He has participated in Antarctic expeditions and contributed to Antarctic scientific research, researching the effects of ozone hole dynamics on the Antarctic ecosystem and the impact of radioactive contamination on the environment. He has published over 100 papers in scientific journals, including Climate Dynamics, Journal of Southern Hemisphere Earth Systems Science, and Antarctic Science. He is the recipient of Fedorov Award from the National Academy of Sciences of Ukraine and Medals "For Service" II Stage and III Stage from the Government of Ukraine.

Milinevsky has been a member of the American Geophysical Union (AGU) since 1990 and the European Geosciences Union (EGU) since 2012. He holds the position of executive editor for the Ukrainian Antarctic Journal and associate editor for the Frontiers in Remote Sensing.

== Education and early career ==
Milinevsky earned his M.S. degree in astronomy and astrophysics from Kyiv State University in 1974, followed by a Ph.D. in geophysics from the Institute of Geophysics in 1980. He held the role of senior researcher at the Space Physics Laboratory of KNU from 1974 to 1990. During this period, he obtained a Doctor of Science degree in geophysics from KNU while engaging in space experiments on plasma formations in the ionosphere and atmospheric clouds via rocket launches from the USSR's Kapustin Yar. He conducted scientific voyages aboard ocean vessels launching meteorological missiles across diverse oceanic regions and served as the Base Commander and Geophysicist during the First Ukrainian Antarctic Expedition at the Vernadsky Station. At Vernadsky Station, his team recorded vital observations for a decade with a focus on meteorology, ionospheric sounding, ozone hole studies, and magnetic measurements.

== Career ==
Milinevsky was involved in the transfer of the Faraday Antarctic Base of British Antarctic Survey, UK, to Ukraine and held the position of deputy director of Sciences at the National Antarctic Scientific Center of Ukraine (NANC) from 1999 to 2006. In 2006, he took the position of head for the Department of Space Physics at KNU, followed by his tenure as the head of the Space Physics Laboratory until 2021. Concurrently, he held the positions of principal scientist of NANC from 2006 to 2023 and participated as a collaborator on the CCMVal Project 42. He was the principal investigator for the CRDF project UKG2-2969-KV-09 focusing on atmospheric aerosols and led international AERONET sites as well as contributing to the Maritime Aerosol Network (MAN) study, which utilized Microtops II sunphotometers. His contributions expanded with him serving as an Adviser to the Ukraine Delegation on Commission Conservation Marina Living Resources and participating in five Ukrainian Antarctic Season Expeditions leading the 6th, 7th, and 10th Expeditions. Since 2001, he has served as the Program Coordinator in Ukraine for the University of South Carolina Chornobyl Research Initiative and holds the position of Professor at JLU. Furthermore, he has been serving as the co-chair for Polar Atmospheric Chemistry at the Tropopause action group of SCAR and Program Coordinator of the Ukraine satellite mission Aerosol-UA within the Space Program of NAS since 2014.

== Research ==
Milinevsky has directed his research towards the stratosphere, tropopause, ozone layer, ozone depletion, aerosols, planetary waves, and sudden stratospheric warmings, alongside exploring space-based techniques and methods for remote sensing of aerosols. His research interests include microwave/millimeter-wave technique used for atmosphere research, climate change processes, and their impact on the ecosystem.

=== Atmospheric aerosol ===
Milinevsky led the coordination of the Aerosol-UA project in collaboration with the Main Astronomical Observatory which involved installing a polarimeter on a satellite to measure aerosol parameters, including their microphysical and chemical properties in the atmosphere, thereby accurately identifying the location, quantity, and composition of aerosols. Through a collaborative effort, he contributed to a study that provided an overview of polarimetric observations and their application in characterizing atmospheric aerosols addressing the challenges and achievements in deriving aerosol properties from polarimetric data. Furthermore, he investigated the inadvertent cooling effect of the ozone hole formation on inner Antarctica, showcasing how subsequent recovery, vital for ozone restoration, posed challenges by potentially altering atmospheric greenhouse gas dynamics and critical ultraviolet radiation levels essential for life's evolution.

=== Environmental research ===
Milinevsky as a member of team led by Timothy Mousseau from South Carolina University, has conducted research investigating the effects of radiation exposure within the Chernobyl-contaminated area. Their research on Chernobyl-exposed barn swallows revealed reduced reproduction and survival rates, suggesting significant negative impacts of radioactive contamination on migratory passerines. The later work also revealed that chronic low-dose radiation reduced breeding success in Myodes glareolus near Chernobyl, with no threshold, and food supplementation benefited only populations in low-radioactive areas, indicating broader ecosystem instability post-nuclear accidents.

In his Antarctic ecology research, Milinevsky examined climate change's effects on Antarctic krill and ecosystems, highlighting the threat posed by environmental stressors like sea ice decline and ocean warming, emphasizing the need for urgent research and precautionary measures by CCAMLR. Additionally, his study on the changes in plant populations on the Argentine Islands centered on two indigenous flowering plants, Deschampsia antarctica and Colobanthus quitensis, revealing a plateau in their populations due to habitat limitations and a slowdown in local climate warming.

== Awards and honors ==
- 1998 – Medal for Service III Stage, President of Ukraine
- 2016 – Special Contribution Award, Akademik Vernadsky Station
- 2021 – Fedorov Award, National Academy of Sciences of Ukraine
- 2021 – Medal for Service II Stage, Government of Ukraine
- 2023 – Academic, Engineering Academy of Ukraine

== Bibliography ==
=== Selected books ===
- Contributions to understanding climate interactions: stratospheric ozone (2022) ISBN 978-9663604718

=== Selected articles ===
- Smirnov, A., Holben, B. N., Giles, D. M., Slutsker, I., O'Neill, N. T., Eck, T. F., ... & Diehl, T. L. (2011). Maritime aerosol network as a component of AERONET–first results and comparison with global aerosol models and satellite retrievals. Atmospheric Measurement Techniques, 4(3), 583–597.
- Flores, H., Atkinson, A., Kawaguchi, S., Krafft, B. A., Milinevsky, G., Nicol, S., ... & Werner, T. (2012). Impact of climate change on Antarctic krill. Marine Ecology Progress Series, 458, 1–19.
- Milinevsky, G., & Danylevsky, V. (2018). Atmospheric aerosol over Ukraine region: Current status of knowledge and research efforts. Frontiers in Environmental Science, 6, 59.
- Dubovik, O., Li, Z., Mishchenko, M. I., Tanré, D., Karol, Y., Bojkov, B., ... & Yin, D. (2019). Polarimetric remote sensing of atmospheric aerosols: Instruments, methodologies, results, and perspectives. Journal of Quantitative Spectroscopy and Radiative Transfer, 224, 474–511.
- Milinevsky, G., Evtushevsky, O., Klekociuk, A., Wang, Y., Grytsai, A., Shulga, V., & Ivaniha, O. (2020). Early indications of anomalous behaviour in the 2019 spring ozone hole over Antarctica. International Journal of Remote Sensing, 41(19), 7530–7540.
- Shi, Y., Evtushevsky, O., Milinevsky, G., Klekociuk, A., Han, W., Ivaniha, O., ... & Zhang, C. (2022). Zonal asymmetry of the stratopause in the 2019/2020 arctic winter. Remote Sensing, 14(6), 1496. Zonal Asymmetry of the Stratopause in the 2019/2020 Arctic Winter.
- Shi, Y., Evtushevsky, O., Milinevsky, G., Wang, X., Klekociuk, A., Han, W., ... & Andrienko, Y. (2024). Impact of the 2018 major sudden stratospheric warming on weather over the midlatitude regions of Eastern Europe and East Asia. Atmospheric Research, 297, 107112.
