= Pavlo Hrytsenko =

- Павло Юхимович Гриценко
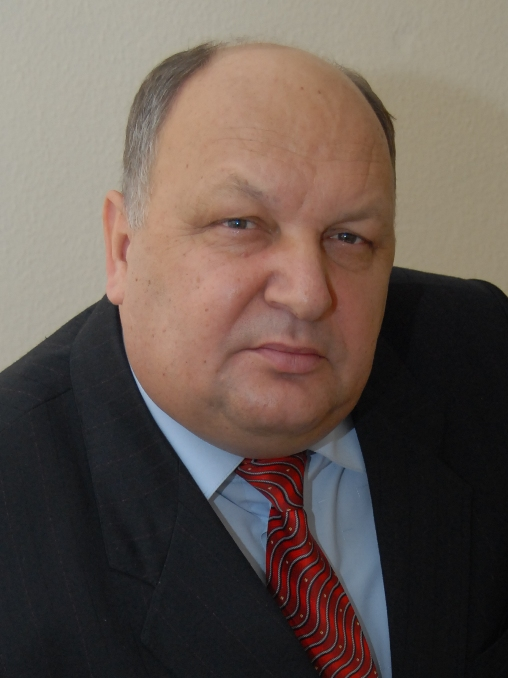
- 2008
- Born: Pavlo Yuhymovych Hrytsenko; September 23, 1950 (age 76); Matroska, Izmail Raion, Odesa Oblast, Ukraine

Academic background
- Education: Odesa University

Academic work
- Discipline: Linguist
- Sub-discipline: Slavic languages

Pavlo Yuhymovych Hrytsenko (Ukrainian: Павло Юхимович Гриценко; born September 23, 1950) is a Ukrainian linguist, doctor of Philology, professor, director of Institute for the Ukrainian Language (Kyiv). Born in Matroska, Izmail Raion, Odesa Oblast, Ukraine. Hrytsenko is a specialist in dialectology of the Ukrainian language, typology of Slavic dialect systems, theory of linguistic geography, dialectal textology and textography, history of linguistics. He is a co-executor of The Slavic Linguistic Atlas, vol. 3, 4а, 4б, 5, 6, 8 (1994–2009).

Hrytsenko is the initiator of a research for dialects in the Chernobyl Exclusion Zone. He is a head of base preparation for Ukrainian dialects dictionary.

Hrytsenko is the member of some international groups of International Committee of Slavists (The Slavic Linguistic Atlas Group, Ethnolinguistics Group), member of editorial board of The Slavic Linguistic Atlas.

Hrytsenko is the author of over 400 publications in Ukrainian and others Slavic languages.
