= Yuri Gritsenko =

Russian serial killer

- Born: Yuri Mikhailovich Gritsenko; 6 November 1961 (age 64); Zelenograd, Moscow Oblast, RSFSR
- Died: 25 January 2025 (officially declared dead); Ukraine
- Other name: "The Zelenograd Chikatilo"
- Conviction: Murder
- Penalty: 22 years imprisonment

Details
- Victims: 5
- Span of crimes: 1993–2001
- Country: Russia
- State: Moscow
- Date apprehended: 19 November 2001

Yuri Mikhailovich Gritsenko (Russian: Ю́рий Миха́йлович Грице́нко; 6 November 1961 – 25 January 2025), known as The Zelenograd Chikatilo (Russian: Зеленоградский Чикатило), was a Russian serial killer who committed 4 brutal murders in his home city of Zelenograd in the first few months of 2001.

== Biography ==
Since childhood, Yuri Gritsenko grew up a closed and unsociable person. His father was a carpenter, while his mother was a strong and strict woman. Psychiatrists are confident that this led to the development of a misogynistic complex in Gritsenko. After serving in the army, Gritsenko began working for the militsiya (Soviet police), believing that his profession would quash his self-doubt. He soon married and had two children, but the complex persisted. Understanding this, Gritsenko became addicted to alcohol. During this time, everything negative splashed out of him, which, in the end, turned him into a murderer. After some time, he was fired from the police forces for his drunkenness, after which he committed a murder and received 8 years of imprisonment. According to the killer, his victim was a prostitute who wanted to rob him, after which he killed her with a blow from a frying pan. When Gritsenko returned from the colony, his family was almost completely broken up.

Since the beginning of April 2001, Gritsenko began attacking women. He struck his victims with a hammer, causing traumatic brain injuries. In just three days in April, he attacked five women, two of which the doctors couldn't save. The survivors couldn't describe the criminal, since he always struck from behind. Gritsenko committed all his attacks in Zelenograd's urban forest during the day when people were returning from work. He loved to walk around in the park, especially in the area of Lake Chernoe. He temporarily laid low for a while, but in August he resumed his attacks. During this time, he inflicted severe head injuries on four women. Local newspapers began pressuring the authorities, and facial composites were hung throughout Zelenograd.

By the beginning of autumn, Gritsenko had committed 4 murders and 5 attempted murders in Zelenograd Forest Park. At the time, he again laid low, but on 19 October 2001, he attacked another woman, this time in the Northern Administrative Okrug of Moscow. Within a week, he beat three more women with a hammer. But soon one of the victims resisted him, snatching the hammer away and escaping her assailant. She then clearly described her attacker's appearance.

On 19 November 2001, the killer was detained during another attack on a woman in Moscow's Friendship Park. To her help suddenly came a young man, who heard her cries. Gritsenko, leaving the seriously injured woman, pounced with the hammer on her saviour, but couldn't kill him. Anatoly Sukhov, who was a bus driver, wounded the killer and waited for the arrival of the authorities. During the eight months of his criminal activities, Gritsenko had committed 4 murders and 10 attempted murders of women. He soon admitted to his crimes. A forensic psychiatric examination in April 2002 found him fully sane. In the summer of 2002, the Moscow City Court sentenced Yuri Gritsenko to 22 years imprisonment, with the Supreme Court of Russia upholding the sentence.

On 16 April 2026, the Russian media outlet Meduza reported that Gritensko had officially been declared dead on 25 January after being killed in Ukraine. This came after he had reportedly signed a contract with the Russian army in September 2023 to fight in Ukraine for the remainder of the war, just one month before he was due to be released, in order to save money for life after his release. Gritensko was initially assigned to a Storm Z unit but because of health problems, he was later transferred to a medical evacuation platoon.

=== In the media ===
- Documentary film from the series "Documentary Detective" - 'Zelenograd Chikatilo'

== See also ==
- List of Russian serial killers
