= Oleksandr Hrytsenko =

Ukrainian poet, translator, and culturologist (1967–2020)

- Олександр Андрійович Гриценко
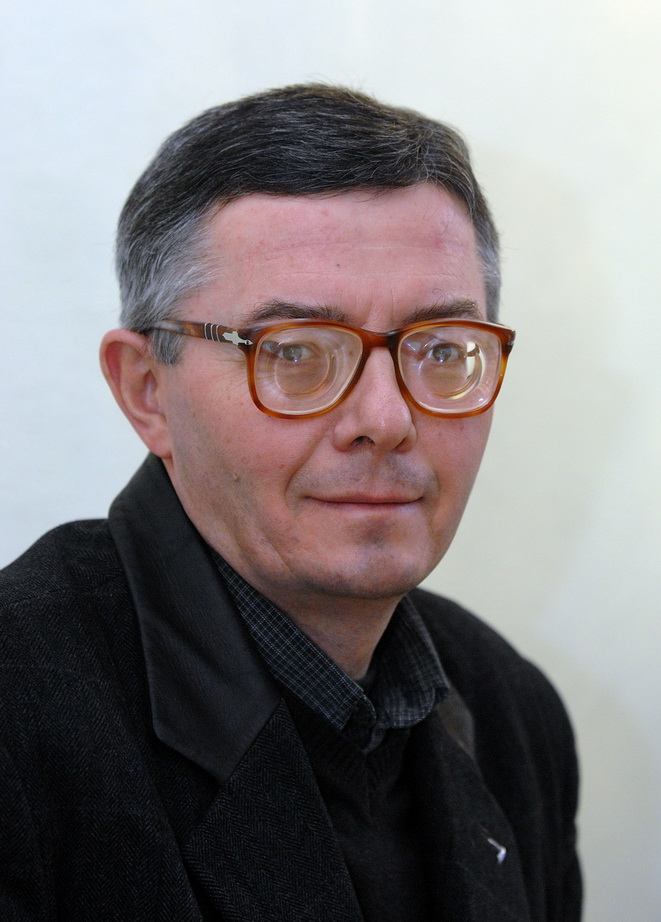
- Born: August 29, 1967; Vatutine, Ukrainian SSR
- Died: April 3, 2020 (aged 52)
- Occupations: Poet, translator, culturologist

Oleksandr Andriyovych Hrytsenko (Ukrainian: Олександр Андрійович Гриценко; August 29, 1967 - April 3, 2020) was a Ukrainian poet, translator, and culturologist. He was the director of the Ukrainian Center of Cultural Research under the Ministry of Culture of Ukraine.

== Biography ==
Hrytsenko was born in Vatutine, a city in Zvenyhorodka Raion, Cherkasy Oblast (region) of the former Ukrainian Soviet Socialist Republic.

In 1980, he received his bachelor’s degree in cybernetics from the Taras Shevchenko National University of Kyiv. He later received his Ph.D from the same university, having defended his doctoral thesis titled, “The Development of Information and Software for Planning the Supply of Local Building Materials.”

From 1980 until 1990, Hrytsenko worked as an engineer in the Department of Economic Cybernetics at the Taras Shevchenko National University of Kyiv. Afterwards, he served as an editor of the journal “Vsesvit” (The Universe) until 1992. Beginning in 1993, he worked as an advisor to the Ministry of Culture of Ukraine, and in 2002 was appointed director of the Ukrainian Center of Cultural Research.

== Works ==
Hrytsenko’s body of work focuses on the crossroads of culture, society, and politics. This is exemplified by titles such as Presidents and Memory. The Political Memory of the Presidents of Ukraine (1994-2014): Background, Message, Implementation, Results (2017), Cultural Policy: Concepts and Experience (1994), and Culture and Power: The Theory and Practice of Cultural Policy in the Modern World (2000).

Immediately following the collapse of the Soviet Union, Hrytsenko is credited with developing Ukraine's study of the humanities.

One of his final books, Pegasus Perestroika: Parodies, Poems, and Polemics (1985-1991) (2018), is a collection of parodical writings and philosophical tracts published in Soviet Ukraine during the final years of the USSR. In the introduction, Hrytsenko states that while he does not believe the works directly influenced the downfall of the Soviet Union, they are still vital pieces to Ukraine’s culture.

In addition, Hrytsenko translated many works from English and Polish into Ukrainian. This includes poems from Emily Dickinson, T.S. Eliot, and E.E. Cummings, along with prose from the Polish authors Witold Gombrowicz and Stanisław Lem.
