= Lopatino =

Lopatino (Russian: Лопатино) is the name of several rural localities in Russia.

== Arkhangelsk Oblast ==
As of 2010, one rural locality in Arkhangelsk Oblast bears this name:

- Lopatino, Arkhangelsk Oblast, a village in Irtovsky Selsoviet of Lensky District

== Ivanovo Oblast ==
As of 2010, two rural localities in Ivanovo Oblast bear this name:

- Lopatino, Furmanovsky District, Ivanovo Oblast, a village in Furmanovsky District
- Lopatino, Lezhnevsky District, Ivanovo Oblast, a village in Lezhnevsky District

== Kaluga Oblast ==
As of 2010, four rural localities in Kaluga Oblast bear this name:

- Lopatino, Dzerzhinsky District, Kaluga Oblast, a village in Dzerzhinsky District
- Lopatino, Maloyaroslavetsky District, Kaluga Oblast, a village in Maloyaroslavetsky District
- Lopatino, Tarussky District, Kaluga Oblast, a selo in Tarussky District
- Lopatino, Zhukovsky District, Kaluga Oblast, a village in Zhukovsky District

== Kirov Oblast ==
As of 2010, one rural locality in Kirov Oblast bears this name:

- Lopatino, Kirov Oblast, a village in Prosnitsky Rural Okrug of Kirovo-Chepetsky District

== Krasnoyarsk Krai ==
As of 2010, one rural locality in Krasnoyarsk Krai bears this name:

- Lopatino, Krasnoyarsk Krai, a village in Voznesensky Selsoviet of Beryozovsky District

== Lipetsk Oblast ==
As of 2010, one rural locality in Lipetsk Oblast bears this name:

- Lopatino, Lipetsk Oblast, a railway station in Petrovsky Selsoviet of Izmalkovsky District

== Republic of Mordovia ==
As of 2010, three rural localities in the Republic of Mordovia bear this name:

- Lopatino (selo), Lyambirsky District, Republic of Mordovia, a selo in Salovsky Selsoviet of Lyambirsky District
- Lopatino (village), Lyambirsky District, Republic of Mordovia, a village in Salovsky Selsoviet of Lyambirsky District
- Lopatino, Torbeyevsky District, Republic of Mordovia, a selo in Lopatinsky Selsoviet of Torbeyevsky District

== Federal city of Moscow ==
As of 2012, one rural locality in the federal city of Moscow bears this name:

- Lopatino, Moscow, a village in Rogovskoye Settlement of Novomoskovsky Administrative Okrug

== Moscow Oblast ==
As of 2012, two rural localities in Moscow Oblast bear this name:

- Lopatino, Leninsky District, Moscow Oblast, a village in Bulatnikovskoye Rural Settlement of Leninsky District
- Lopatino, Mozhaysky District, Moscow Oblast, a village in Yurlovskoye Rural Settlement of Mozhaysky District

== Nizhny Novgorod Oblast ==
As of 2010, eight rural localities in Nizhny Novgorod Oblast bear this name:

- Lopatino, Shakhunya, Nizhny Novgorod Oblast, a village in Khmelevitsky Selsoviet of the town of oblast significance of Shakhunya
- Lopatino, Bogorodsky District, Nizhny Novgorod Oblast, a settlement in Kamensky Selsoviet of Bogorodsky District
- Lopatino, Krasnobakovsky District, Nizhny Novgorod Oblast, a village in Prudovsky Selsoviet of Krasnobakovsky District
- Lopatino, Lukoyanovsky District, Nizhny Novgorod Oblast, a selo in Lopatinsky Selsoviet of Lukoyanovsky District
- Lopatino, Sergachsky District, Nizhny Novgorod Oblast, a selo in Lopatinsky Selsoviet of Sergachsky District
- Lopatino, Tonshayevsky District, Nizhny Novgorod Oblast, a village under the administrative jurisdiction of the work settlement of Tonshayevo in Tonshayevsky District
- Lopatino, Vadsky District, Nizhny Novgorod Oblast, a selo in Lopatinsky Selsoviet of Vadsky District
- Lopatino, Varnavinsky District, Nizhny Novgorod Oblast, a village in Bogorodsky Selsoviet of Varnavinsky District

== Novgorod Oblast ==
As of 2010, two rural localities in Novgorod Oblast bear this name:

- Lopatino, Khvoyninsky District, Novgorod Oblast, a village in Pesskoye Settlement of Khvoyninsky District
- Lopatino, Moshenskoy District, Novgorod Oblast, a village in Kirovskoye Settlement of Moshenskoy District

== Novosibirsk Oblast ==
As of 2010, one rural locality in Novosibirsk Oblast bears this name:

- Lopatino, Novosibirsk Oblast, a selo in Tatarsky District

== Penza Oblast ==
As of 2010, five rural localities in Penza Oblast bear this name:

- Lopatino, Belinsky District, Penza Oblast, a village in Kozlovsky Selsoviet of Belinsky District
- Lopatino, Gorodishchensky District, Penza Oblast, a selo in Nizhneyelyuzansky Selsoviet of Gorodishchensky District
- Lopatino, Lopatinsky District, Penza Oblast, a selo in Lopatinsky Selsoviet of Lopatinsky District
- Lopatino, Mokshansky District, Penza Oblast, a selo in Tsarevshchinsky Selsoviet of Mokshansky District
- Lopatino, Vadinsky District, Penza Oblast, a village in Bolshelukinsky Selsoviet of Vadinsky District

== Pskov Oblast ==
As of 2010, eight rural localities in Pskov Oblast bear this name:

- Lopatino, Bezhanitsky District, Pskov Oblast, a village in Bezhanitsky District
- Lopatino, Novorzhevsky District, Pskov Oblast, a village in Novorzhevsky District
- Lopatino, Palkinsky District, Pskov Oblast, a village in Palkinsky District
- Lopatino, Pskovsky District, Pskov Oblast, a village in Pskovsky District
- Lopatino, Pushkinogorsky District, Pskov Oblast, a village in Pushkinogorsky District
- Lopatino, Pustoshkinsky District, Pskov Oblast, a village in Pustoshkinsky District
- Lopatino (Sebezhskoye Rural Settlement), Sebezhsky District, Pskov Oblast, a village in Sebezhsky District; municipally, a part of Sebezhskoye Rural Settlement of that district
- Lopatino (Boyarinovskaya Rural Settlement), Sebezhsky District, Pskov Oblast, a village in Sebezhsky District; municipally, a part of Boyarinovskaya Rural Settlement of that district

== Ryazan Oblast ==
As of 2010, one rural locality in Ryazan Oblast bears this name:

- Lopatino, Ryazan Oblast, a selo in Lopatinsky Rural Okrug of Skopinsky District

== Sakhalin Oblast ==
As of 2010, two rural localities in Sakhalin Oblast bear this name:

- Lopatino, Nevelsky District, Sakhalin Oblast, a selo in Nevelsky District
- Lopatino, Tomarinsky District, Sakhalin Oblast, a selo in Tomarinsky District

== Samara Oblast ==
As of 2010, three rural localities in Samara Oblast bear this name:

- Lopatino, Krasnoyarsky District, Samara Oblast, a selo in Krasnoyarsky District
- Lopatino, Stavropolsky District, Samara Oblast, a selo in Stavropolsky District
- Lopatino, Volzhsky District, Samara Oblast, a selo in Volzhsky District

== Saratov Oblast ==
As of 2010, two rural localities in Saratov Oblast bear this name:

- Lopatino, Balashovsky District, Saratov Oblast, a selo in Balashovsky District
- Lopatino, Rtishchevsky District, Saratov Oblast, a selo in Rtishchevsky District

== Smolensk Oblast ==
As of 2010, one rural locality in Smolensk Oblast bears this name:

- Lopatino, Smolensk Oblast, a village in Bobrovichskoye Rural Settlement of Yelninsky District

== Tambov Oblast ==
As of 2010, one rural locality in Tambov Oblast bears this name:

- Lopatino, Tambov Oblast, a selo under the administrative jurisdiction of Inzhavinsky Settlement Council of Inzhavinsky District

== Tula Oblast ==
As of 2010, one rural locality in Tula Oblast bears this name:

- Lopatino, Tula Oblast, a village in Rassvetovsky Rural Okrug of Venyovsky District

== Tver Oblast ==
As of 2010, five rural localities in Tver Oblast bear this name:

- Lopatino, Bologovsky District, Tver Oblast, a village in Kuzhenkinskoye Rural Settlement of Bologovsky District
- Lopatino, Kuvshinovsky District, Tver Oblast, a village in Pryamukhinskoye Rural Settlement of Kuvshinovsky District
- Lopatino, Penovsky District, Tver Oblast, a village in Zayevskoye Rural Settlement of Penovsky District
- Lopatino, Staritsky District, Tver Oblast, a village in Pankovo Rural Settlement of Staritsky District
- Lopatino, Torzhoksky District, Tver Oblast, a village in Tredubskoye Rural Settlement of Torzhoksky District

== Vologda Oblast ==
As of 2010, one rural locality in Vologda Oblast bears this name:

- Lopatino, Vologda Oblast, a village in Kosmarevsky Selsoviet of Nyuksensky District

== Yaroslavl Oblast ==
As of 2010, three rural localities in Yaroslavl Oblast bear this name:

- Lopatino, Breytovsky District, Yaroslavl Oblast, a village in Breytovsky Rural Okrug of Breytovsky District
- Lopatino, Nekouzsky District, Yaroslavl Oblast, a village in Stanilovsky Rural Okrug of Nekouzsky District
- Lopatino, Uglichsky District, Yaroslavl Oblast, a village in Nikolsky Rural Okrug of Uglichsky District
