= Baksheyevo, Ivanovo Oblast =

Baksheyevo Бакшеево
- Village
- Location within Ivanovo Oblast Location within Russia
- Coordinates: 57°17′N 41°09′E
- Country: Russia
- Region: Ivanovo Oblast
- District: Furmanovsky District
- Time zone: UTC+3:00

Baksheyevo (Russian: Бакшеево) is a rural locality (a village) in Furmanovsky District, Ivanovo Oblast, Russia. Population: 16 (2010 census);

== Geography ==
This rural locality is located 5 kilometres (3.1 mi) from Furmanov (the district's administrative centre), 35 kilometres (22 mi) from Ivanovo (capital of Ivanovo Oblast) and 273 kilometres (170 mi) from Moscow. Belkino is the nearest rural locality.
