= Olyukovo =

Olyukovo Олюково
- Village
- Location within Ivanovo Oblast Location within Russia
- Coordinates: 57°10′N 41°13′E
- Country: Russia
- Region: Ivanovo Oblast
- District: Furmanovsky District
- Time zone: UTC+3:00

Olyukovo (Russian: Олюково) is a rural locality (a village) in Furmanovsky District, Ivanovo Oblast, Russia. Population: 10 (2010 census);

== Geography ==
This rural locality is located 11 kilometres (6.8 mi) from Furmanov (the district's administrative centre), 26 kilometres (16 mi) from Ivanovo (capital of Ivanovo Oblast) and 269 kilometres (167 mi) from Moscow. Kotovo is the nearest rural locality.
