= Ivankovo, Furmanovsky District =

Ivankovo Иванково
- Village
- Location within Ivanovo Oblast Location within Russia
- Coordinates: 57°14′N 41°09′E
- Country: Russia
- Region: Ivanovo Oblast
- District: Furmanovsky District
- Time zone: UTC+3:00

Ivankovo (Russian: Иванково) is a rural locality (a village) in Furmanovsky District, Ivanovo Oblast, Russia. Population: 742 (2010 census);

== Geography ==
This rural locality is located 3 kilometres (1.9 mi) from Furmanov (the district's administrative centre), 29 kilometres (18 mi) from Ivanovo (capital of Ivanovo Oblast) and 269 kilometres (167 mi) from Moscow. Popadyino is the nearest rural locality.
