= Mikhalkovo, Furmanovsky District =

Mikhalkovo Михальково
- Village
- Location within Ivanovo Oblast Location within Russia
- Coordinates: 57°12′N 41°03′E
- Country: Russia
- Region: Ivanovo Oblast
- District: Furmanovsky District
- Time zone: UTC+3:00

Mikhalkovo (Russian: Михальково) is a rural locality (a village) in Furmanovsky District, Ivanovo Oblast, Russia. Population: 10 (2010 census);

== Geography ==
This rural locality is located 5 kilometres (3.1 mi) from Furmanov (the district's administrative centre), 25 kilometres (16 mi) from Ivanovo (capital of Ivanovo Oblast) and 263 kilometres (163 mi) from Moscow. Paltsevo is the nearest rural locality.
