= Maryinskoye =

Maryinskoye Марьинское
- Village
- Location within Ivanovo Oblast Location within Russia
- Coordinates: 57°18′N 40°53′E
- Country: Russia
- Region: Ivanovo Oblast
- District: Furmanovsky District
- Time zone: UTC+3:00

Maryinskoye (Russian: Марьинское) is a rural locality (a selo) in Furmanovsky District, Ivanovo Oblast, Russia. Population: 211 (2010 census);

== Geography ==
This rural locality is located 15 kilometres (9.3 mi) from Furmanov (the district's administrative centre), 36 kilometres (22 mi) from Ivanovo (capital of Ivanovo Oblast) and 262 kilometres (163 mi) from Moscow. Filikovka is the nearest rural locality.
