= Maksimovka, Ivanovo Oblast =

Maksimovka Максимовка
- Village
- Location within Ivanovo Oblast Location within Russia
- Coordinates: 57°10′N 41°15′E
- Country: Russia
- Region: Ivanovo Oblast
- District: Furmanovsky District
- Time zone: UTC+3:00

Maksimovka (Russian: Максимовка) is a rural locality (a village) in Furmanovsky District, Ivanovo Oblast, Russia. Population: 17 (2010 census);

== Geography ==
This rural locality is located 12 kilometres (7.5 mi) from Furmanov (the district's administrative centre), 27 kilometres (17 mi) from Ivanovo (capital of Ivanovo Oblast) and 270 kilometres (170 mi) from Moscow. Vysokovo is the nearest rural locality.
