= Privolye, Ivanovo Oblast =

Privolye Приволье
- Village
- Location within Ivanovo Oblast Location within Russia
- Coordinates: 57°08′N 41°23′E
- Country: Russia
- Region: Ivanovo Oblast
- District: Furmanovsky District
- Time zone: UTC+3:00

Privolye (Russian: Приволье) is a rural locality (a village) in Furmanovsky District, Ivanovo Oblast, Russia. Population: 24 (2010 census);

== Geography ==
This rural locality is located 20 kilometres (12 mi) from Furmanov (the district's administrative centre), 30 kilometres (19 mi) from Ivanovo (capital of Ivanovo Oblast) and 275 kilometres (171 mi) from Moscow. Ignatovskoye is the nearest rural locality.
