= Dulyapino =

Dulyapino Дуляпино
- Village
- Location within Ivanovo Oblast Location within Russia
- Coordinates: 57°15′N 40°49′E
- Country: Russia
- Region: Ivanovo Oblast
- District: Furmanovsky District
- Time zone: UTC+3:00

Dulyapino (Russian: Дуляпино) is a rural locality (a selo) in Furmanovsky District, Ivanovo Oblast, Russia. Population: 1,285 (2010 census);

== Geography ==
This rural locality is located 17 kilometres (11 mi) from Furmanov (the district's administrative centre), 30 kilometres (19 mi) from Ivanovo (capital of Ivanovo Oblast) and 255 kilometres (158 mi) from Moscow. Sobantseyevo is the nearest rural locality.
