= Slabunino =

Slabunino Слабунино
- Village
- Location within Ivanovo Oblast Location within Russia
- Coordinates: 57°19′N 40°51′E
- Country: Russia
- Region: Ivanovo Oblast
- District: Furmanovsky District
- Time zone: UTC+3:00

Slabunino (Russian: Слабунино) is a rural locality (a village) in Furmanovsky District, Ivanovo Oblast, Russia. Population: 29 (2010 census);

== Geography ==
This rural locality is located 17 kilometres (11 mi) from Furmanov (the district's administrative centre), 38 kilometres (24 mi) from Ivanovo (capital of Ivanovo Oblast) and 262 kilometres (163 mi) from Moscow. Skokovo is the nearest rural locality.
