= Kalikino, Furmanovsky District =

Kalikino Каликино
- Village
- Location within Ivanovo Oblast Location within Russia
- Coordinates: 57°13′N 40°53′E
- Country: Russia
- Region: Ivanovo Oblast
- District: Furmanovsky District
- Time zone: UTC+3:00

Kalikino (Russian: Каликино) is a rural locality (a village) in Furmanovsky District, Ivanovo Oblast, Russia. Population: 44 (2010 census);

== Geography ==
This rural locality is located 14 kilometres (8.7 mi) from Furmanov (the district's administrative centre), 27 kilometres (17 mi) from Ivanovo (capital of Ivanovo Oblast) and 256 kilometres (159 mi) from Moscow. Balakhna is the nearest rural locality.
