= Filikovka =

Filikovka Филиковка
- Village
- Location within Ivanovo Oblast Location within Russia
- Coordinates: 57°18′N 40°54′E
- Country: Russia
- Region: Ivanovo Oblast
- District: Furmanovsky District
- Time zone: UTC+3:00

Filikovka (Russian: Филиковка) is a rural locality (a village) in Furmanovsky District, Ivanovo Oblast, Russia. Population: 5 (2010 census);

== Geography ==
This rural locality is located 14 kilometres (8.7 mi) from Furmanov (the district's administrative centre), 36 kilometres (22 mi) from Ivanovo (capital of Ivanovo Oblast) and 263 kilometres (163 mi) from Moscow. Maryinskoye is the nearest rural locality.
