= Akultsevo =

Akultsevo Акульцево
- Village
- Location within Ivanovo Oblast Location within Russia
- Coordinates: 57°14′N 41°04′E
- Country: Russia
- Region: Ivanovo Oblast
- District: Furmanovsky District
- Time zone: UTC+3:00

Akultsevo (Russian: Акульцево) is a rural locality (a village) in Furmanovsky District, Ivanovo Oblast, Russia. Population: 38 (2010 census);

== Geography ==
This rural locality is located 3 kilometres (1.9 mi) from Furmanov (the district's administrative centre), 29 kilometres (18 mi) from Ivanovo (capital of Ivanovo Oblast) and 266 kilometres (165 mi) from Moscow. Petrushikha is the nearest rural locality.
