= Belino, Ivanovo Oblast =

Belino Белино
- Village
- Location within Ivanovo Oblast Location within Russia
- Coordinates: 57°17′N 41°09′E
- Country: Russia
- Region: Ivanovo Oblast
- District: Furmanovsky District
- Time zone: UTC+3:00

Belino (Russian: Белино) is a rural locality (a village) in Furmanovsky District, Ivanovo Oblast, Russia. Population: 140 (2010 census);

== Geography ==
This rural locality is located 6 kilometres (3.7 mi) from Furmanov (the district's administrative centre), 36 kilometres (22 mi) from Ivanovo (capital of Ivanovo Oblast) and 273 kilometres (170 mi) from Moscow. Baksheyevo is the nearest rural locality.
