= Dushilovo =

Dushilovo Душилово
- Village
- Location within Ivanovo Oblast Location within Russia
- Coordinates: 57°13′N 40°59′E
- Country: Russia
- Region: Ivanovo Oblast
- District: Furmanovsky District
- Time zone: UTC+3:00

Dushilovo (Russian: Душилово) is a rural locality (a village) in Furmanovsky District, Ivanovo Oblast, Russia. Population: 25 (2010 census);

== Geography ==
This rural locality is located 7 kilometres (4.3 mi) from Furmanov (the district's administrative centre), 27 kilometres (17 mi) from Ivanovo (capital of Ivanovo Oblast) and 261 kilometres (162 mi) from Moscow. Svistelevo is the nearest rural locality.
