= Yermolino, Furmanovsky District =

Yermolino Ермолино
- Village
- Location within Ivanovo Oblast Location within Russia
- Coordinates: 57°07′N 41°16′E
- Country: Russia
- Region: Ivanovo Oblast
- District: Furmanovsky District
- Time zone: UTC+3:00

Yermolino (Russian: Ермолино) is a rural locality (a selo) in Furmanovsky District, Ivanovo Oblast, Russia. Population: 41 (2010 census);

== Geography ==
This rural locality is located 17 kilometres (11 mi) from Furmanov (the district's administrative centre), 24 kilometres (15 mi) from Ivanovo (capital of Ivanovo Oblast) and 268 kilometres (167 mi) from Moscow. Popadinki is the nearest rural locality.
