= Mikhaylovskoye, Furmanovsky District =

Mikhaylovskoye Михайловское
- Village
- Location within Ivanovo Oblast Location within Russia
- Coordinates: 57°19′N 41°09′E
- Country: Russia
- Region: Ivanovo Oblast
- District: Furmanovsky District
- Time zone: UTC+3:00

Mikhaylovskoye (Russian: Михайловское) is a rural locality (a selo) in Furmanovsky District, Ivanovo Oblast, Russia. Population: 82 (2010 census);

== Geography ==
This rural locality is located 8 kilometres (5.0 mi) from Furmanov (the district's administrative centre), 38 kilometres (24 mi) from Ivanovo (capital of Ivanovo Oblast) and 275 kilometres (171 mi) from Moscow. Yazykovo is the nearest rural locality.
