= Pogost, Ivanovo Oblast =

Pogost Погост
- Village
- Location within Ivanovo Oblast Location within Russia
- Coordinates: 57°13′N 41°14′E
- Country: Russia
- Region: Ivanovo Oblast
- District: Furmanovsky District
- Time zone: UTC+3:00

Pogost (Russian: Погост) is a rural locality (a village) in Furmanovsky District, Ivanovo Oblast, Russia. Population: 225 (2010 census);

== Geography ==
This rural locality is located 9 kilometres (5.6 mi) from Furmanov (the district's administrative centre), 30 kilometres (19 mi) from Ivanovo (capital of Ivanovo Oblast) and 272 kilometres (169 mi) from Moscow. Abronikha is the nearest rural locality.
