= Novinki, Furmanovsky District =

Novinki Новинки
- Village
- Location within Ivanovo Oblast Location within Russia
- Coordinates: 57°14′N 40°56′E
- Country: Russia
- Region: Ivanovo Oblast
- District: Furmanovsky District
- Time zone: UTC+3:00

Novinki (Russian: Новинки) is a rural locality (a village) in Furmanovsky District, Ivanovo Oblast, Russia. Population: 6 (2010 census);

== Geography ==
This rural locality is located 10 kilometres (6.2 mi) from Furmanov (the district's administrative centre), 28 kilometres (17 mi) from Ivanovo (capital of Ivanovo Oblast) and 259 kilometres (161 mi) from Moscow. Mostechnoye is the nearest rural locality.
