= Novoye Pervoye =

Novoye Pervoye Новое Первое
- Village
- Location within Ivanovo Oblast Location within Russia
- Coordinates: 57°18′N 40°52′E
- Country: Russia
- Region: Ivanovo Oblast
- District: Furmanovsky District
- Time zone: UTC+3:00

Novoye Pervoye (Russian: Новое Первое) is a rural locality (a village) in Furmanovsky District, Ivanovo Oblast, Russia. Population: 13 (2010 census);

== Geography ==
This rural locality is located 16 kilometres (9.9 mi) from Furmanov (the district's administrative centre), 35 kilometres (22 mi) from Ivanovo (capital of Ivanovo Oblast) and 260 kilometres (160 mi) from Moscow. Maryinskoye is the nearest rural locality.
