= Snetinovo =

Snetinovo Снетиново
- Village
- Location within Ivanovo Oblast Location within Russia
- Coordinates: 57°09′N 41°18′E
- Country: Russia
- Region: Ivanovo Oblast
- District: Furmanovsky District
- Time zone: UTC+3:00

Snetinovo (Russian: Снетиново) is a rural locality (a village) in Furmanovsky District, Ivanovo Oblast, Russia. Population: 186 (2010 census);

== Geography ==
This rural locality is located 16 kilometres (9.9 mi) from Furmanov (the district's administrative centre), 28 kilometres (17 mi) from Ivanovo (capital of Ivanovo Oblast) and 272 kilometres (169 mi) from Moscow. Zakharyino is the nearest rural locality.
