= Domovitsy =

Domovitsy Домовицы
- Village
- Location within Ivanovo Oblast Location within Russia
- Coordinates: 57°09′N 41°10′E
- Country: Russia
- Region: Ivanovo Oblast
- District: Furmanovsky District
- Time zone: UTC+3:00

Domovitsy (Russian: Домовицы) is a rural locality (a selo) in Furmanovsky District, Ivanovo Oblast, Russia. Population: 27 (2010 census);

== Geography ==
This rural locality is located 11 kilometres (6.8 mi) from Furmanov (the district's administrative centre), 22 kilometres (14 mi) from Ivanovo (capital of Ivanovo Oblast) and 265 kilometres (165 mi) from Moscow. Kalinino is the nearest rural locality.
