= Mostechnoye =

Mostechnoye Мостечное
- Village
- Location within Ivanovo Oblast Location within Russia
- Coordinates: 57°14′N 40°54′E
- Country: Russia
- Region: Ivanovo Oblast
- District: Furmanovsky District
- Time zone: UTC+3:00

Mostechnoye (Russian: Мостечное) is a rural locality (a village) in Furmanovsky District, Ivanovo Oblast, Russia. Population: 26 (2010 census);

== Geography ==
This rural locality is located 12 kilometres (7.5 mi) from Furmanov (the district's administrative centre), 28 kilometres (17 mi) from Ivanovo (capital of Ivanovo Oblast) and 257 kilometres (160 mi) from Moscow. Kalikino is the nearest rural locality.
