= Stupino, Furmanovsky District =

Stupino Ступино
- Village
- Location within Ivanovo Oblast Location within Russia
- Coordinates: 57°14′N 40°50′E
- Country: Russia
- Region: Ivanovo Oblast
- District: Furmanovsky District
- Time zone: UTC+3:00

Stupino (Russian: Ступино) is a rural locality (a village) in Furmanovsky District, Ivanovo Oblast, Russia. Population: 5 (2010 census);

== Geography ==
This rural locality is located 17 kilometres (11 mi) from Furmanov (the district's administrative centre), 28 kilometres (17 mi) from Ivanovo (capital of Ivanovo Oblast) and 254 kilometres (158 mi) from Moscow. Ivantsevo is the nearest rural locality.
