= Renkovo =

Renkovo Реньково
- Village
- Location within Ivanovo Oblast Location within Russia
- Coordinates: 57°09′N 41°17′E
- Country: Russia
- Region: Ivanovo Oblast
- District: Furmanovsky District
- Time zone: UTC+3:00

Renkovo (Russian: Реньково) is a rural locality (a village) in Furmanovsky District, Ivanovo Oblast, Russia. Population: 64 (2010 census);

== Geography ==
This rural locality is located 16 kilometres (9.9 mi) from Furmanov (the district's administrative centre), 27 kilometres (17 mi) from Ivanovo (capital of Ivanovo Oblast) and 271 kilometres (168 mi) from Moscow. Snetinovo is the nearest rural locality.
