= Zakharyino =

Zakharyino Захарьино
- Village
- Location within Ivanovo Oblast Location within Russia
- Coordinates: 57°09′N 41°19′E
- Country: Russia
- Region: Ivanovo Oblast
- District: Furmanovsky District
- Time zone: UTC+3:00

Zakharyino (Russian: Захарьино) is a rural locality (a village) in Furmanovsky District, Ivanovo Oblast, Russia. Population: 66 (2010 census);

== Geography ==
This rural locality is located 15 kilometres (9.3 mi) from Furmanov (the district's administrative centre), 28 kilometres (17 mi) from Ivanovo (capital of Ivanovo Oblast) and 272 kilometres (169 mi) from Moscow. Snetinovo is the nearest rural locality.
