= Maluyevo =

Maluyevo Малуево
- Village
- Location within Ivanovo Oblast Location within Russia
- Coordinates: 57°11′N 41°53′E
- Country: Russia
- Region: Ivanovo Oblast
- District: Furmanovsky District
- Time zone: UTC+3:00

Maluyevo (Russian: Малуево) is a rural locality (a village) in Furmanovsky District, Ivanovo Oblast, Russia. Population: 10 (2010 census);

== Geography ==
This rural locality is located 15 kilometres (9.3 mi) from Furmanov (the district's administrative centre), 23 kilometres (14 mi) from Ivanovo (capital of Ivanovo Oblast) and 253 kilometres (157 mi) from Moscow. Balakhna is the nearest rural locality.
