= Morozovo, Furmanovsky District =

Morozovo Морозово
- Village
- Location within Ivanovo Oblast Location within Russia
- Coordinates: 57°15′N 41°02′E
- Country: Russia
- Region: Ivanovo Oblast
- District: Furmanovsky District
- Time zone: UTC+3:00

Morozovo (Russian: Морозово) is a rural locality (a village) in Furmanovsky District, Ivanovo Oblast, Russia. Population: 10 (2010 census);

== Geography ==
This rural locality is located 4 kilometres (2.5 mi) from Furmanov (the district's administrative centre), 30 kilometres (19 mi) from Ivanovo (capital of Ivanovo Oblast) and 265 kilometres (165 mi) from Moscow. Derevenki is the nearest rural locality.
