= Kosogory =

Kosogory (Russian: Косогоры) is the name of several rural localities in Russia:

- Kosogory, Ivanovo Oblast, village Furmanovsky District, Ivanovo Oblast
- Kosogory, Republic of Mordovia, village in Bolshebereznikovsky District, Republic of Mordovia
- Kosogory, Perm Krai, village in Permsky District, Perm Krai
