= Khromtsovo =

Khromtsovo Хромцово
- Village
- Location within Ivanovo Oblast Location within Russia
- Coordinates: 57°13′N 40°57′E
- Country: Russia
- Region: Ivanovo Oblast
- District: Furmanovsky District
- Time zone: UTC+3:00

Khromtsovo (Russian: Хромцово) is a rural locality (a selo) in Furmanovsky District, Ivanovo Oblast, Russia. Population: 1,069 (2010 census);

== Geography ==
This rural locality is located 9 kilometres (5.6 mi) from Furmanov (the district's administrative centre), 25 kilometres (16 mi) from Ivanovo (capital of Ivanovo Oblast) and 259 kilometres (161 mi) from Moscow. Dushilovo is the nearest rural locality.
