= Furmanovsky =

Furmanovsky (masculine), Furmanovskaya (feminine), or Furmanovskoye (neuter) may refer to:

- Furmanovsky District, a district of Ivanovo Oblast, Russia
- Furmanovskoye Urban Settlement, a municipal formation which the town of Furmanov in Furmanovsky District of Ivanovo Oblast, Russia is incorporated as
