= Kalinino, Furmanovsky District =

Kalinino Калинино
- Village
- Location within Ivanovo Oblast Location within Russia
- Coordinates: 57°09′N 41°12′E
- Country: Russia
- Region: Ivanovo Oblast
- District: Furmanovsky District
- Time zone: UTC+3:00

Kalinino (Russian: Калинино) is a rural locality (a village) in Furmanovsky District, Ivanovo Oblast, Russia. Population: 22 (2010 census);

== Geography ==
This rural locality is located 11 kilometres (6.8 mi) from Furmanov (the district's administrative centre), 24 kilometres (15 mi) from Ivanovo (capital of Ivanovo Oblast) and 267 kilometres (166 mi) from Moscow. Safronovo is the nearest rural locality.
