= Yakovlevskoye, Furmanovsky District =

Yakovlevskoye Яковлевское
- Village
- Location within Ivanovo Oblast Location within Russia
- Coordinates: 57°15′N 41°46′E
- Country: Russia
- Region: Ivanovo Oblast
- District: Furmanovsky District
- Time zone: UTC+3:00

Yakovlevskoye (Russian: Яковлевское) is a rural locality (a village) in Furmanovsky District, Ivanovo Oblast, Russia. Population: 9 (2010 census);

== Geography ==
This rural locality is located 21 kilometres (13 mi) from Furmanov (the district's administrative centre), 33 kilometres (21 mi) from Ivanovo (capital of Ivanovo Oblast) and 253 kilometres (157 mi) from Moscow. Yuryevskoye is the nearest rural locality.
