= Yuryevskoye, Furmanovsky District =

Yuryevskoye Юрьевское
- Village
- Location within Ivanovo Oblast Location within Russia
- Coordinates: 57°17′N 40°46′E
- Country: Russia
- Region: Ivanovo Oblast
- District: Furmanovsky District
- Time zone: UTC+3:00

Yuryevskoye (Russian: Юрьевское) is a rural locality (a selo) in Furmanovsky District, Ivanovo Oblast, Russia. Population: 75 (2010 census);

== Geography ==
This rural locality is located 21 kilometres (13 mi) from Furmanov (the district's administrative centre), 35 kilometres (22 mi) from Ivanovo (capital of Ivanovo Oblast) and 255 kilometres (158 mi) from Moscow. Yakovlevskoye is the nearest rural locality.
