= Lopatinsky =

Lopatinsky (masculine), Lopatinskaya (feminine), or Lopatinskoye (neuter) may refer to:

- Lopatinsky District, a district of Penza Oblast, Russia
- Lopatinskaya, a rural locality (a village) in Arkhangelsk Oblast, Russia
