= Maxim Khrenov =

Russian serial killer (born 1979)

- Born: Maxim Nikolayevich Khrenov; 11 February 1979 (age 47); Ivanovo, Ivanovo Oblast, RSFSR
- Other names: "The Ivanovo Maniac" "The Maniac with the utility knife"
- Conviction: Murder x4
- Penalty: Life imprisonment

Details
- Victims: 4+
- Span of crimes: 2010–2011
- Country: Russia
- State: Ivanovo
- Date apprehended: 24 October 2018

Maxim Nikolayevich Khrenov (Russian: Максим Николаевич Хренов), known as The Ivanovo Maniac (Russian: Ивановский маньяк), is a Russian serial killer and rapist who raped and murdered at least four women in Ivanovo Oblast from 2010 to 2011. He was arrested for these crimes years later, and eventually sentenced to life imprisonment.

Khrenov is best known for briefly being a suspect in the Danilovsky Maniac case.

== Early life ==
Very little is known about Khrenov's early life. Born on 11 February 1979 in Ivanovo, he began exhibiting disturbing sexual behavior in his teenage years and soon afterwards started engaging in crime. Between the mid-1990s and the late 2000s, Khrenov was repeatedly arrested on charges of theft and rape.

In 2009, Khrenov was paroled from prison, but struggled to find a job. Because of this, he started using his Lada Samara to provide unlicensend taxi services. By the early 2010s, he mastered several specialties in the construction industry, got married and had two children.

Following his marriage, Khrenov earned a reputation as a tidy and hard-working teetotaler who seemingly never exhibited any concerning behavior.

== Murders ==
Between the spring of 2010 and the summer of 2011, Khrenov committed at least four murders involving robbery and rape. His modus operandi consisted of offering women rides and then distracting them by talking about random topics while he drove them into the woods outside Ivanovo. Once he reached an isolated area, he would then threatened them at gunpoint to give up all their valuables. Once he stole everything he could, Khrenov would sexually assault and murder the victim, either by strangling her with an electrical wire or slitting her throat with a utility knife.

His first murder occurred in the spring of 2010, when he picked up a 32-year-old woman who was visiting her parents from Saint Petersburg. He then drove her to the woods near the village of Bunkovo, where he raped and strangled her with an electric wire. The killer's biological samples and a fragment of his hair were recovered and DNA was isolated from them, but this was not immediately linked to him.

In the spring of 2011, Khrenov picked up an 18-year-old girl and drove her to a quarry near the Ivanovo-Furmanov Highway, where he robbed, raped and strangled her with the electric wire.

Khrenov committed his final known murders only a few months later, in the summer. He picked up two young women, 19 and 21, respectively, then drove them to the outskirts of the village of Zheleznodorozhny. There, he raped them at gunpoint and then cut their throats using a utility knife. After killing both victims, he set the remains on fire, and then buried them in the forest.

== Investigation ==
At the scene of the last two murders, investigators found tire tracks, later identified as those of a Lada Samara. This was indirectly confirmed by a resident of Zheleznodorozhny, who claimed that he had seen a similar car on the day of the murders. Due to this, investigators set out to interview all owners of such cars and similar brands, but this did not lead to the arrest of the killer.

Further investigation of the DNA established that the same person committed the four murders, after which special units were formed with the aid of the Department of Forensic Science and the Ministry of Internal Affairs. The research into the case lasted more than seven years, with more than 370 people being questioned from among relatives and acquaintances of the victims, as well as the residents of the villages and hamlets were the crimes had occurred. Bus drivers, truck drivers, and persons previously convicted of robbery and rape were interrogated, with additional forensic examinations being conducted by experts based in Moscow, Yaroslavl and Ivanovo.

== Arrest, trial and imprisonment ==
Around 2018, investigators considered the possibility that the blood and salive samples taken from ex-cons might have been defective or deteriorated, after which they requested that all people convicted of violent crimes resubmit said samples. As Khrenov was a convicted rapist, he was obligated to provide his blood and saliva, which was later conclusively identified as being identical to that of the serial killer.

Following the identification, Khrenov was arrested on 24 October 2018 in the city of Cherepovets, Vologda Oblast, where he had gone to do house painting and plastering work. During subsequent interrogations, he fully admitted his guilt and gave a number of confessions, with his testimony being confirmed by CCTV footage installed on highways. In it, Khrenov's car was spotted on the days of the murders near places where the victims' bodies would later be found. After checking his telephone info, it was also confirmed that he was in the vicinity of all murder sites.

In early 2020, Khrenov was charged with the four murders and put on trial behind closed doors. At the start, he unexpectedly recanted his confessions and proclaimed his innocence, but due to the exhaustive evidence against him, he was found guilty on all counts. As a result, he received a sentence of life imprisonment on 3 July 2020, with the first seven years set to be served in a standard prison before being transferred to a high-security penal colony. He was also ordered to pay 5 million rubles in damages to the victims' family members.

In his final statement to the court, Khrenov refused to apologize to his victims' family members and continued to insist that he was innocent.

=== Current status ===
Following his arrest, Khrenov was briefly considered a possible suspect in the still-unsolved Danilovsky Maniac case, but no evidence of his involvement was found and he was later ruled out. He is currently being investigated for any other possible crimes, as investigators believe that he might have committed further crimes in the city of Cherepovets, where he was initially arrested.

As of April 2025, he has not been charged with any other violent crimes.

== See also ==
- List of Russian serial killers
