= Danilovsky Maniac =

Unidentified Russian serial killer

- Other names: "The Maniac with Dull Eyes" "The Pitinsky Maniac"

Details
- Victims: 7 (possibly 14)
- Span of crimes: 2004–2007
- Country: Russia
- State: Vologda
- Date apprehended: Not apprehended

The Danilovsky Maniac (Russian: Даниловский маньяк) is an unidentified Russian serial killer. It is suspected that he committed at least seven murders between 2004 and 2007 in the city of Cherepovets, in the Vologda Oblast. Three of the murders were committed on an abandoned construction site on Danilovsky Street, from which the killer earned his nickname.

== Murders ==
In 2008, the criminal case totaled 18 volumes, and about 200 people were interviewed. The Cherepovets Mayor's Office announced a reward of 500 thousand rubles for anybody who helped to catch the maniac.

=== Chronology ===
- On 4 February 2004, 17-year-old Marina Ostrovskaya went missing.
- In August 2004, a 19-year-old pupil of the metallurgical college, Irina Popova, was raped and stifled in the Pitinsky wasteland.
- On 5 September 2004, 22-year-old Tatyana Baeva was raped and strangled at the local art school.
- On 8 December 2004, 17-year-old Tatyana Maksimova was raped and strangled on Milyutina Street.
- On 26 June 2005, 31-year-old Lyudmila Miroshnichenko failed to arrive at work.
- On 14 July 2005, the maniac killed 19-year-old Svetlana Stepanova. When the investigators arrived at the crime scene, two more rotting corpses were found nearby – those of Miroshnichenko and Ostrovskaya.
- On 11 June 2007, 17-year-old Natalya Zakalova was killed.
- Probably involved in the murder of a woman named Elena, which occurred in 2010 in Vologda.
- Possibly involved in a series of murders of young girls that occurred between 1999 and 2003.

On the walls near the site of the murders, drawings of a pornographic nature were found.

=== Current status ===
As of 2024, authorities have not publicly named any suspects in the case, with all the cases remaining unsolved. According to the local Investigative Committee, assuming that the killer is still alive, he would be between 58 and 73 years old and may have bald spots in his hair. In December 2023, local newspaper Cherepovetskaya Istina reported that local police have begun taking DNA samples from older male residents whose age matches the suggested age of the murderer.

Residents of Cherepovets have proposed multiple theories about who the killer may have been or what might have happened to him, with the most prevalent being that he is either deceased or imprisoned on other charges. At one point, there were rumours that serial killer Maxim Khrenov - who was arrested in Cherepovets in 2019 after he was linked to four murders committed in the Ivanovo Oblast from 2010 to 2011 - could be the killer. However, no evidence has been presented to link him to the Danilovsky Maniac, and he would later be sentenced to life imprisonment for the Ivanovo murders.

== See also ==
- List of fugitives from justice who disappeared
- List of Russian serial killers
