= Lopatino, Vologda Oblast =

Lopatino Лопатино
- Village
- Location within Vologda Oblast Location within Russia
- Coordinates: 60°15′N 44°22′E
- Country: Russia
- Region: Vologda Oblast
- District: Nyuksensky District
- Time zone: UTC+3:00

Lopatino (Russian: Лопатино) is a rural locality (a village) in Gorodishchenskoye Rural Settlement, Nyuksensky District, Vologda Oblast, Russia. The population was 35 as of 2002.

== Geography ==
Lopatino is located 41 km southeast of Nyuksenitsa (the district's administrative centre) by road. Bor is the nearest rural locality.
