= Lopatino, Lopatinsky District, Penza Oblast =

Rural locality in Penza Oblast, Russia

Coordinates: 52°37′05″N 45°48′43″E

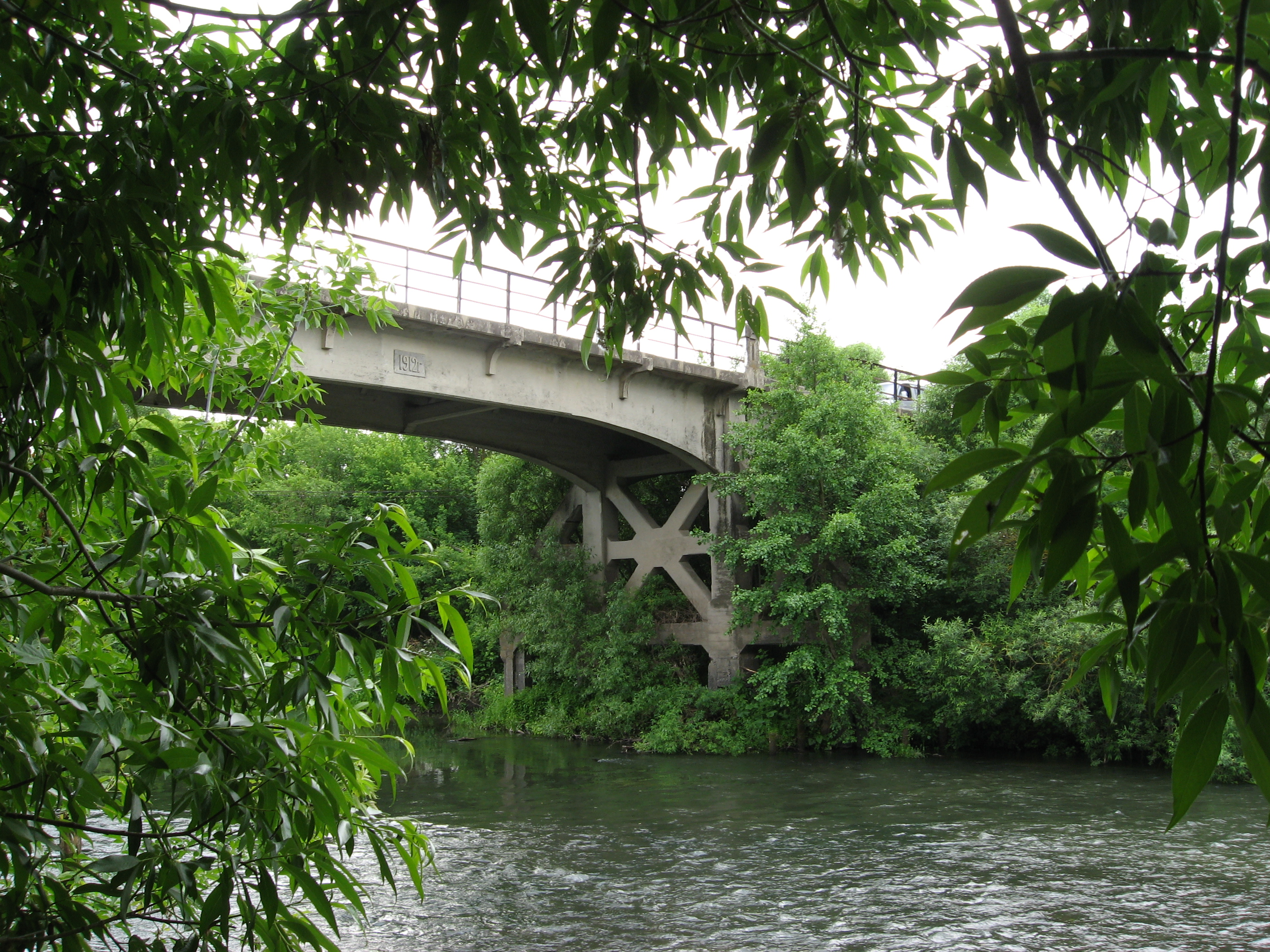
Lopatino Old Bridge

Lopatino (Russian: Лопа́тино) is a rural locality (a selo) and the administrative center of Lopatinsky District, Penza Oblast, Russia. Population: 4,392 (2010 census); 4,376 (2002 census); 4,759 (1989 Soviet census).
