= Lopatino, Lezhnevsky District, Ivanovo Oblast =

Lopatino Лопатино
- Village
- Location within Ivanovo Oblast Location within Russia
- Coordinates: 56°36′N 41°00′E
- Country: Russia
- Region: Ivanovo Oblast
- District: Lezhnevsky District
- Time zone: UTC+3:00

Lopatino (Russian: Лопатино) is a rural locality (a village) in Lezhnevsky District, Ivanovo Oblast, Russia. Population: 21 (2010 census);

== Geography ==
This rural locality is located 19 kilometres (12 mi) from Lezhnevo (the district's administrative centre), 42 kilometres (26 mi) from Ivanovo (capital of Ivanovo Oblast) and 228 kilometres (142 mi) from Moscow. Romanki is the nearest rural locality.
