= Kosogory, Perm Krai =

Kosogory Косогоры
- Village
- Location within Perm Krai Location within Russia
- Coordinates: 57°55′N 56°13′E
- Country: Russia
- Region: Perm Krai
- District: Permsky District
- Time zone: UTC+5:00

Kosogory (Russian: Косогоры) is a rural locality (a village) in Frolovskoye Rural Settlement, Permsky District, Perm Krai, Russia. The population was 3 as of 2010. There are 2 streets.

== Geography ==
Kosogory is located 14 km south of Perm (the district's administrative centre) by road. Yakunchiki is the nearest rural locality.
