= Lopatinsky District =

Lopatinsky District Лопатинский район (Russian)
- District
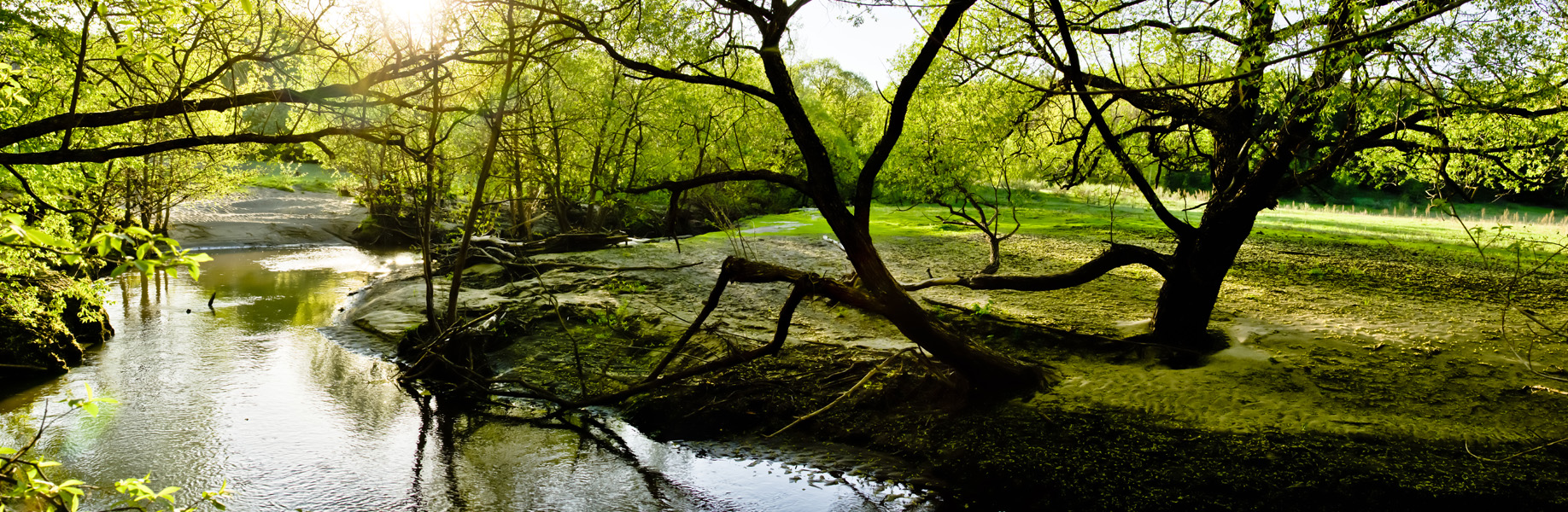
- Forest in Lopatinsky District

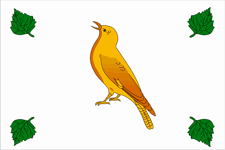
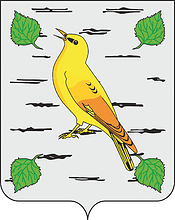
- Flag Coat of arms
- Location of Lopatinsky District in Penza Oblast
- Coordinates: 52°37′14″N 45°48′37″E
- Country: Russia
- Federal subject: Penza Oblast
- Administrative center: Lopatino

Area
  - Total: 1,440 km^{2} (560 sq mi)

Population (2010 Census)
  - Total: 14,942
  - Density: 10.4/km^{2} (26.9/sq mi)
  - Urban: 0%
  - Rural: 100%

Administrative structure
  - Administrative divisions: 11 selsoviet
  - Inhabited localities: 40 rural localities

Municipal structure
  - Municipally incorporated as: Lopatinsky Municipal District
  - Municipal divisions: 0 urban settlements, 11 rural settlements
- Time zone: UTC+3 (MSK)
- OKTMO ID: 56642000
- Website: http://rlopat.pnzreg.ru/

Lopatinsky District (Russian: Лопа́тинский райо́н) is an administrative and municipal district (raion), one of the twenty-seven in Penza Oblast, Russia. It is located in the southeast of the oblast. The area of the district is 1,440 square kilometers (560 sq mi). Its administrative center is the rural locality (a selo) of Lopatino. Population: 14,942 (2010 Census); 16,190 (2002 census); 17,838 (1989 Soviet census). The population of Lopatino accounts for 29.4% of the district's total population.
