= Furmanov, Ivanovo Oblast =

Town in Ivanovo Oblast, Russia

Furmanov Фурманов
- Town
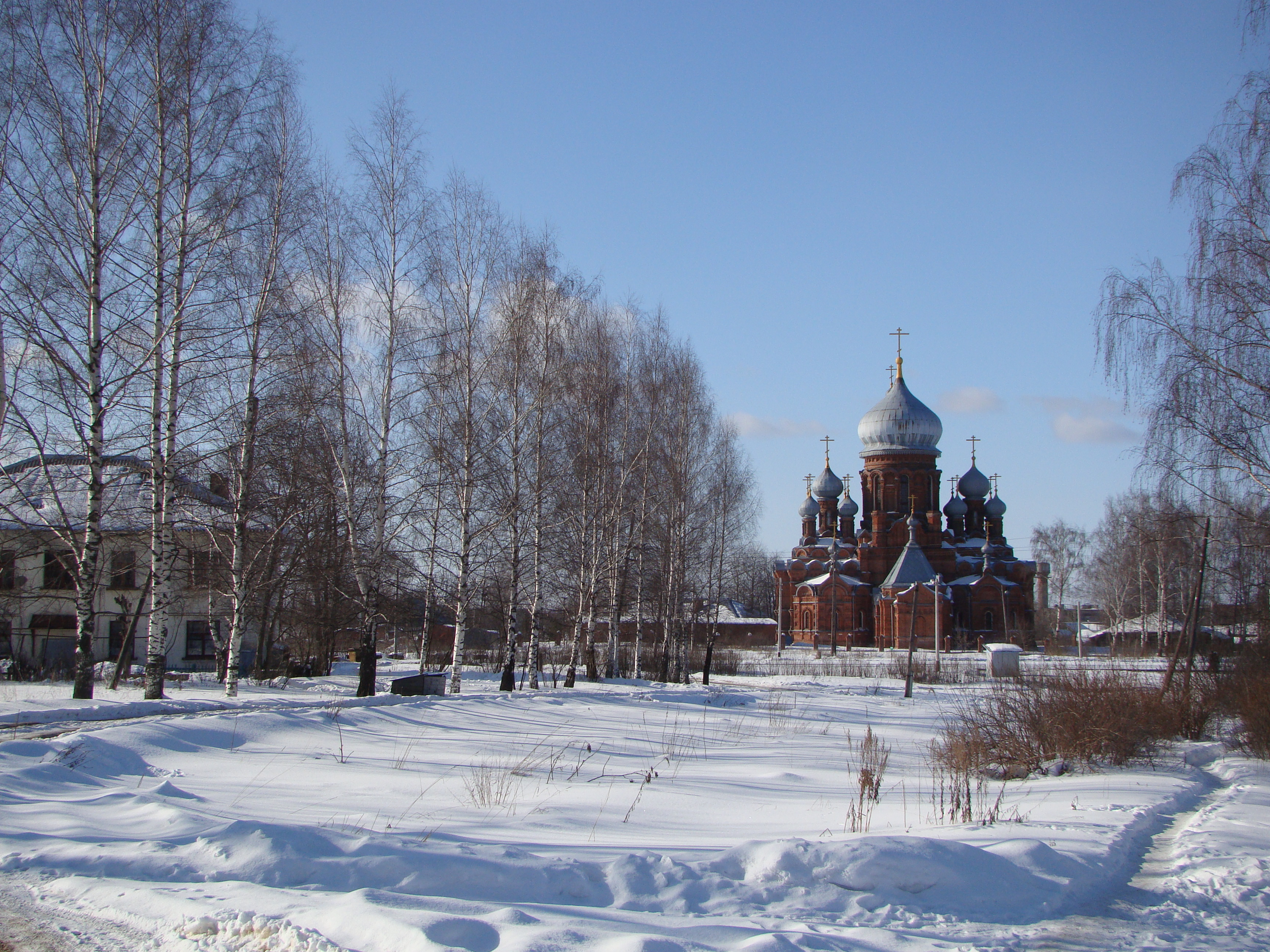
- Joy of All Who Sorrow Icon Church, in Furmanov

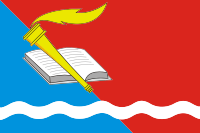
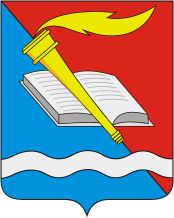
- Flag Coat of arms
- Interactive map of Furmanov
- Location of Furmanov Furmanov (Ivanovo Oblast)
- Coordinates: 57°15′N 41°08′E
- Country: Russia
- Federal subject: Ivanovo Oblast
- Administrative district: Furmanovsky District
- Town status since: 1918
- Elevation: 130 m (430 ft)

Population (2010 Census)
  - Total: 36,144
  - Estimate (2021): 29,715 (−17.8%)

Administrative status
  - Capital of: Furmanovsky District

Municipal status
  - Municipal district: Furmanovsky Municipal District
  - Urban settlement: Furmanovskoye Urban Settlement
  - Capital of: Furmanovsky Municipal District, Furmanovskoye Urban Settlement
- Time zone: UTC+3 (MSK)
- Postal codes: 155520, 155521, 155523, 155526, 155539
- OKTMO ID: 24631101001
- Website: www.furmanov.su

Furmanov (Russian: Фу́рманов) is a town and the administrative center of Furmanovsky District in Ivanovo Oblast, Russia. Population: 29,715 (2021 census); 36,144 (2010 census); 40,874 (2002 census); 46,182 (1989 Soviet census). It was previously known as Sereda (until March 13, 1941).

== History ==
In 1918, it was incorporated as the town of Sereda (Середа). On March 13, 1941, it was renamed Furmanov after writer and Bolshevik Dmitry Furmanov.

== Administrative and municipal status ==
Within the framework of administrative divisions, Furmanov serves as the administrative center of Furmanovsky District, to which it is directly subordinated. Prior to the adoption of the Law #145-OZ On the Administrative-Territorial Division of Ivanovo Oblast in December 2010, it used to be incorporated separately as an administrative unit with the status equal to that of the districts.

As a municipal division, the town of Furmanov is incorporated within Furmanovsky Municipal District as Furmanovskoye Urban Settlement.

== International relations ==
=== Twin towns and sister cities ===
Furmanov is twinned with the town of Domodedovo in Moscow Oblast, Russia.
