= Furmanovsky District =

Furmanovsky District Фурмановский район (Russian)
- District
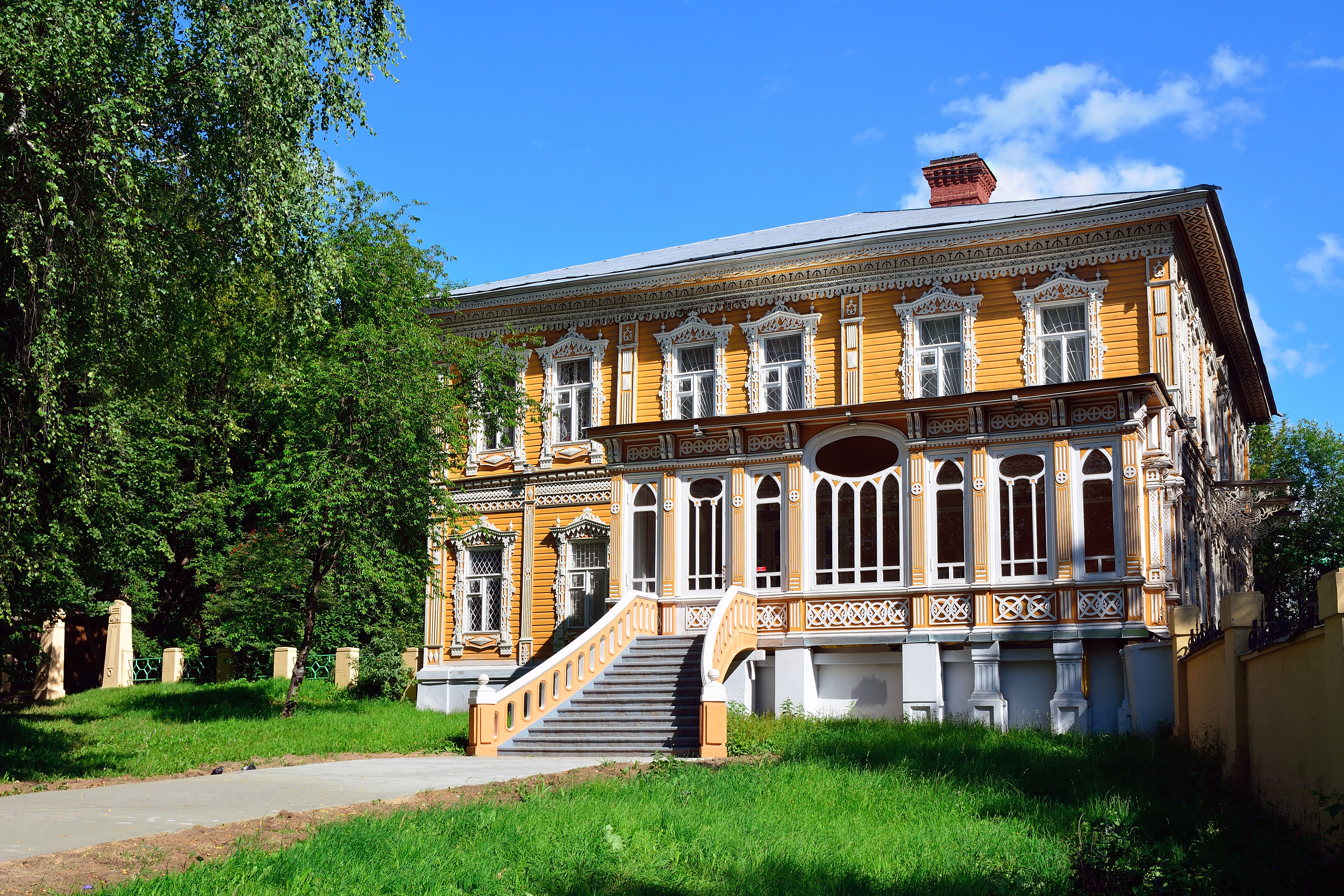
- Estate in Furmanovsky District

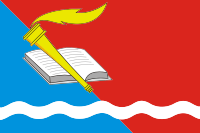
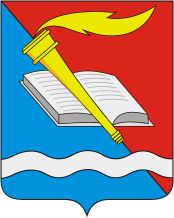
- Flag Coat of arms
- Location of Furmanovsky District in Ivanovo Oblast
- Coordinates: 57°15′N 41°06′E
- Country: Russia
- Federal subject: Ivanovo Oblast
- Established: 14 January 1929
- Administrative center: Furmanov

Area
  - Total: 763.2 km^{2} (294.7 sq mi)

Population (2010 Census)
  - Total: 6,733
  - Density: 8.822/km^{2} (22.85/sq mi)
  - Urban: 0%
  - Rural: 100%

Administrative structure
  - Inhabited localities: 1 cities/towns, 104 rural localities

Municipal structure
  - Municipally incorporated as: Furmanovsky Municipal District
  - Municipal divisions: 1 urban settlements, 5 rural settlements
- Time zone: UTC+3 (MSK)
- OKTMO ID: 24631000
- Website: http://www.furmanov.net/

Furmanovsky District (Russian: Фу́рмановский райо́н) is an administrative and municipal district (raion), one of the twenty-one in Ivanovo Oblast, Russia. It is located in the north of the oblast. The area of the district is 763.2 square kilometers (294.7 sq mi). Its administrative center is the town of Furmanov. Population (excluding the administrative center): 6,733 (2010 census); 6,524 (2002 Census); 8,017 (1989 Soviet census). Population with the administrative center: 34,537 (2021 census). The population of Furmanov accounts for 86.0% of the district's total population.

== Administrative and municipal status ==
The town of Furmanov serves as the administrative center of the district. Prior to the adoption of the Law #145-OZ On the Administrative-Territorial Division of Ivanovo Oblast in December 2010, it was administratively incorporated separately from the district. As a municipal division, Furmanov is incorporated within Furmanovsky Municipal District as Furmanovskoye Urban Settlement.
