= Prisons in Russia =

Prison system in Russia

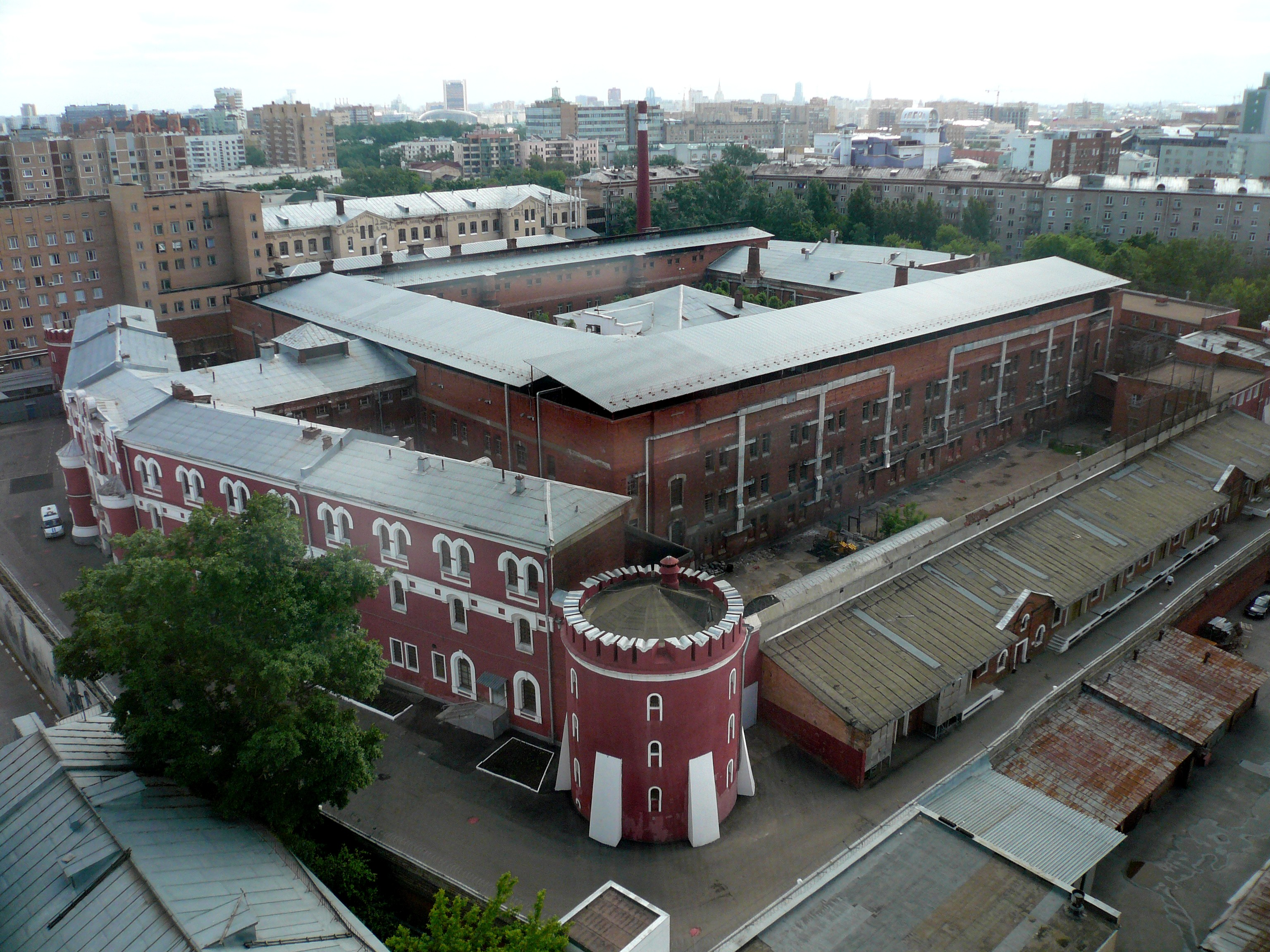
Butyrka prison in Moscow

Prisons in Russia consist of four types of facilities: pre-trial institutions; educative or juvenile colonies; corrective colonies; and prisons.

A corrective colony is the most common, with 705 institutions (excluding 7 corrective colonies for convicts imprisoned for life) in 2019 across the administrative divisions of Russia. There were also 8 prisons, 23 juvenile facilities, and 211 pre-trial facilities in 2019.

Prisons in Russia are administered by the Federal Penitentiary Service (FSIN). The FSIN's main responsibilities are to ensure the completion of criminal penalties by convicted persons as well as hold detainees accused of crimes. The FSIN is also responsible for the prisoners’ physical well-being and rights under the Russian government.

In January 2023 the FSIN has a total prisoner population of 433,006, which included all pretrial detainees. This number makes up 0.3% of the population. Only 8.9% of prisoners are female, and juveniles make up 0.2%. The incarceration rate in 2018 was 416 per 100,000 people. There were 947 total institutions that operated under the FSIN in 2015 with a total capacity that could reach 812,804. Only 79% of this capacity was in use that year. Notably, from 2000 to 2020, the prison population has dropped substantially by 536,476.

Until 1998, the corrections system in Russia was controlled and operated by the Ministry of the Internal Affairs. During this time of operation, it left many aspects of the prisons dismal at best. The equipment, properties, communications systems, and weapons that were owned and used for the sole purpose of corrections were neither maintained nor updated. This was due to the drastic underfinancing of the corrections systems. The prison management felt the worst of this treatment during this period under the authority of the Ministry of Internal Affairs. It was reported to have never received more than 60% of its actual required funds throughout that time of oversight. Funds dropped to nothing in the three months prior to the Russian Federation's Ministry of Justice taking over responsibility of the corrections system.

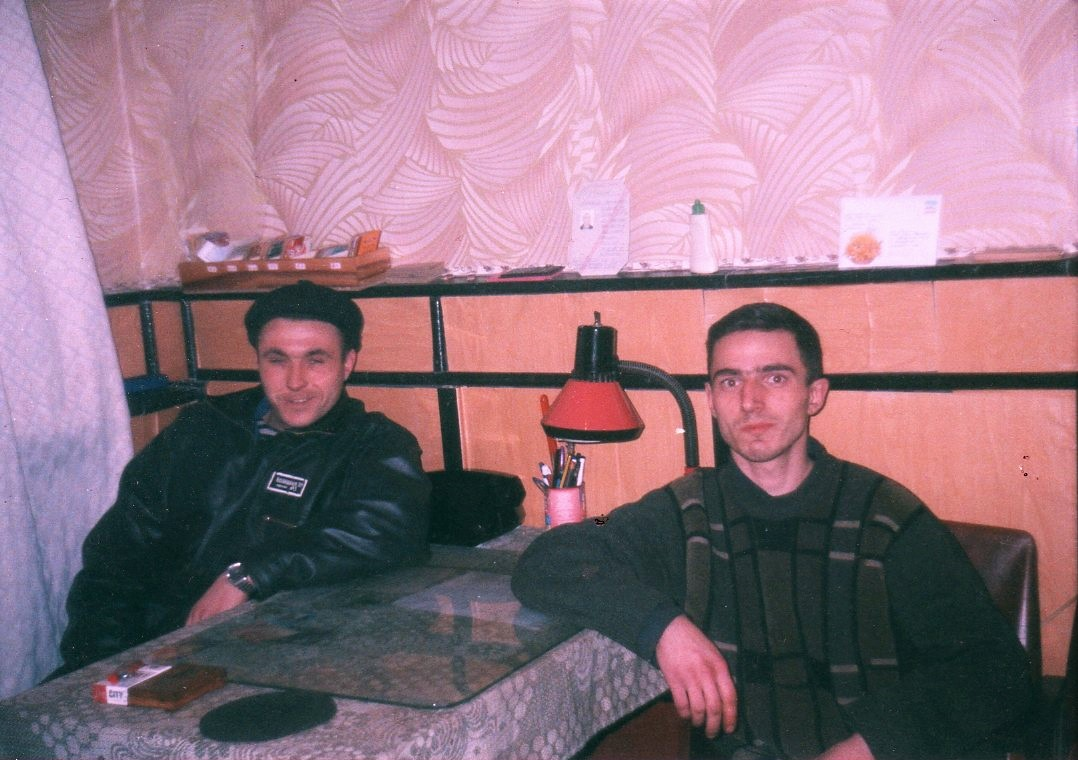
Prisoners in a strict regime corrective colony

== Corrective labor colonies ==
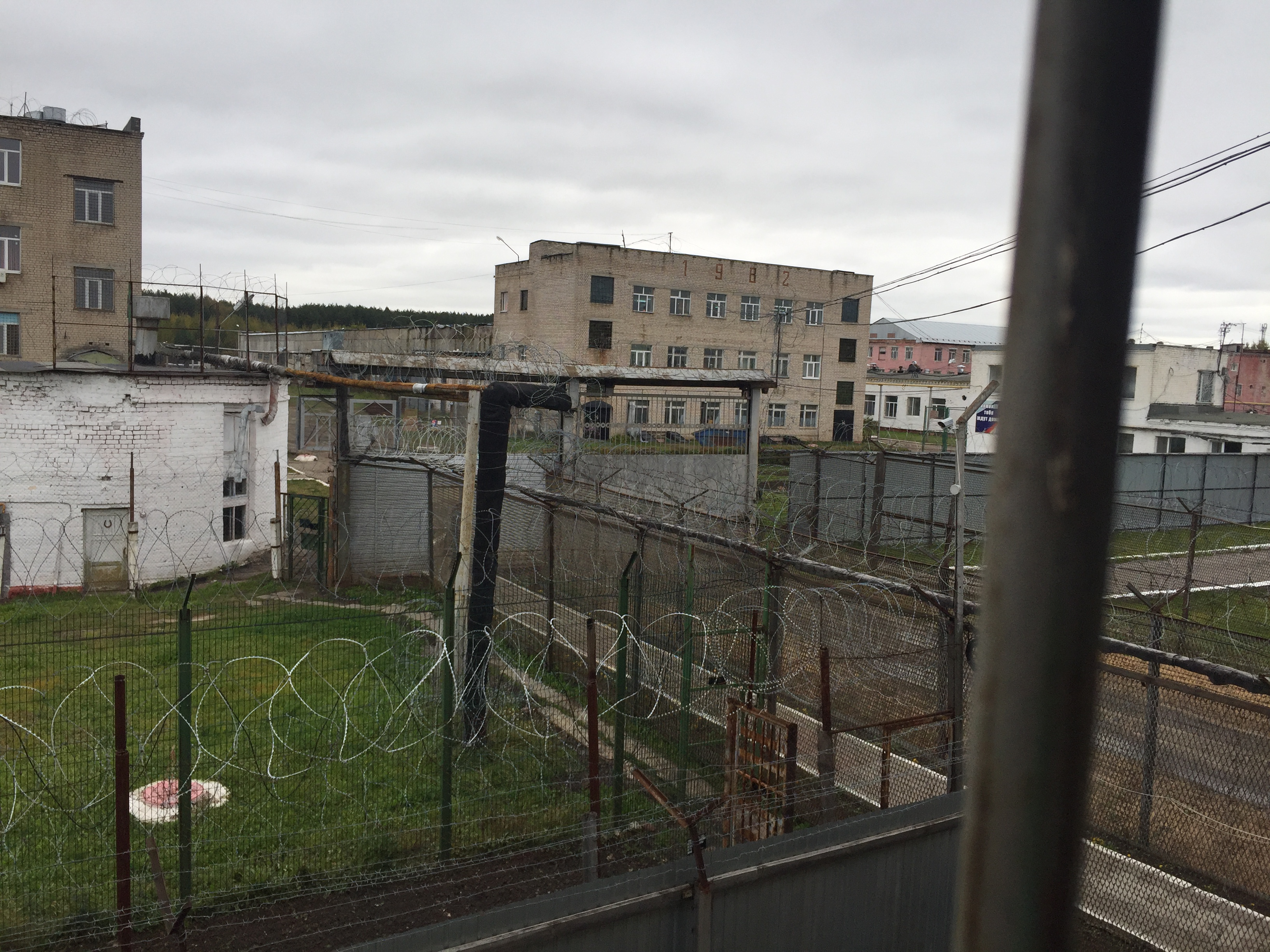
Strict regime corrective colony in Kokhma, Ivanovo Oblast

Corrective colony regimes are categorized as very strict/special, strict, general, and open. The detachment (отря́д or otryad) is the basic unit of the prison. When not in the detachment, prisoners are required to participate in penal labour, which is in the form of work brigades in colony production zones where prisoners earn a wage of which most is paid to the colony for their upkeep.

== History ==
A map of incarceration rates by country

In 2011, under the presidency of Dimitri Medvedev the reform of criminal law was implemented which reduced minimal prison terms for significant number of crimes to two months.

In 2013 the Pussy Riot activist Nadezhda Tolokonnikova wrote a public letter which drew international attention to prison conditions in Russia. Ilya Shablinsky, a member of the presidential human-rights council who audited her prison, found conditions close to those of "slave labour". Auditors found women prisoners working 14 hours a day with one day off a month.

Prisons were divided into the "red" (run by prison authorities) and the "black" (administered by inmates). According to The Economist (2013) change would demand a deeper reform of the police and the courts.

During the Russian invasion of Ukraine that began in 2022, Russia has recruited substantial numbers of convicts from its prisons into Russian penal military units, both through the Wagner Group and through official government units like Storm-Z and Storm-V.

== List of prisons ==
=== Pre-trial detention centers ===
- Butyrka Prison, Moscow
- Matrosskaya Tishina, Moscow
- Kresty Prison, Saint Petersburg
- Kresty-2 Prison, Saint Petersburg
- Oryol Prison, Oryol, Oryol Oblast
- Lefortovo Prison, Moscow
- SIZO-2, Taganrog

=== Former political prisons ===
- Lubyanka Building, Moscow
- Bolshoy Dom, Saint Petersburg
- Solovetsky Monastery, Solovetsky Islands, White Sea
- Taganka Prison, Moscow
- Sukhanovo Prison, Moscow

=== Corrective colonies for convicts ===
- Corrective colony No. 2, Mordovia
- Corrective colony No. 2, Vladimir Oblast
- Corrective colony No. 6, Vladimir Oblast
- FKU IK-3, Kharp, Yamalo-Nenets Autonomous Okrug
- Lgov Prison, Lgov, Kursk Oblast
- Chernokozovo detention center, Chernokozovo, Chechnya

==== Colonies for convicts sentenced to life imprisonment ====
- Black Dolphin, Sol-Iletsk, Orenburg Oblast
- White Swan, Solikamsk, Perm Krai
- Polar Owl, Kharp, Yamalo-Nenets Autonomous Okrug
- Snowflake, Elban, Khabarovsk Krai
- Black Berkut, Ivdel, Sverdlovsk Oblast
- Mordovian Zone, Mordovia
- Vologda’s fiver, Lake Novozero, Vologda Oblast

=== Prisons for convicts ===
- Vladimir Central Prison, Vladimir, Vladimir Oblast

== Tuberculosis ==
=== Overview ===
Tuberculosis has been an ever-present concern within the Russian prison system, and recently a new infectious threat has emerged: multi-drug-resistant tuberculosis (MDR-TB). Infectious disease researchers Nachega & Chaisson estimate that of the 10% of Russian prisoners with active TB (roughly 100,000 people), 40% of new cases are multi-drug resistant. This prevalence has alarmed public health experts, as have studies such as public health surveyors Bobrik et al.’s report that in 1997, approximately 50% of all Russian prison deaths were caused by TB. Although both MDR-TB and non-resistant TB are treatable, infectious disease experts like Paul Farmer note that the second-line drugs used in MDR-TB therapy are more expensive than the standard TB regimen, which can limit a MDR-TB patient’s access to care.

=== Living conditions and spread of TB in Russian prisons ===
There are several factors within the Russian prison system that contribute to the severity and spread of MDR-TB. Overcrowding in prisons is especially conducive to the spread of tuberculosis; according to Bobrik et al., inmates in a prison hospital have 3 meters of personal space, and inmates in correctional colonies have 2 meters. Specialized hospitals and treatment facilities within the prison system, known as TB colonies, are intended to isolate infected prisoners to prevent transmission; however, as Ruddy et al. demonstrate, there are not enough colonies and isolation facilities to sufficiently protect staff and other inmates. Furthermore, in an International Journal of Tuberculosis and Lung Disease article, Kimerling et al. point out that arrested Russians cannot be transferred to TB colonies unless they are convicted, which allows them to potentially infect fellow cellmates before release or prosecution. Researchers Fry et al. note that even within the St. Petersberg prison system, which contains 8 TB colonies, prisons facilities are in need of further isolation systems as well as diagnostic and laboratory equipment. In addition to overcrowded and inadequately isolated conditions, many prisons lack sufficient ventilation, which increases likelihood of transmission. In Stern’s report on prison health, she notes that within Russian prisons, heavy shutters of wood or steel “keep out most of the air and most of the light…[and] a wise policy would be to remove them.” Bobrik et al. have also noted food shortages within prisons, which deprive inmates of the nutrition necessary for healthy functioning.

In addition to the physical conditions within Russian prisons, research by Nachega & Chaisson and Shin et al. show that co-morbidity of HIV and increased abuse of alcohol and drugs within prisoner populations contribute to worsened outcomes for TB patients. Non-compliance with treatment regimens has also been highlighted as contributing increasing drug resistance. In Fry et al.’s study on TB outcomes within St. Petersburg prisons, they estimated that 74% of infected prisoners did not report visiting a TB treatment facility upon release from a correctional facility. Public health researchers Gelmanova et al. note that while non-adherence does not directly increase drug resistance, the heightened bacterial load of non-compliant and untreated patients does increase the chances that the bacteria will mutate into a drug-resistant strain.

=== Historical context ===
In Kimerling’s article within the International Journal of Tuberculosis and Lung Disease, he notes that the rise of TB and MDR-TB within Russia is a recent phenomenon. Prior to the dissolution of the Soviet Union, "tuberculosis rates were substantially lower [in Russia] than they are today". The previous TB control program was marked by actions such as annual chest radiographies to screen the Russian population, an emphasis on isolation of patients within long-term hospital settings, and mandatory BCG vaccination. However, this system dissolved with the Soviet Union, as Russia's faltering economy failed to provide the industry necessary for production and purchase of adequate TB medication, healthcare workers, labs and diagnostic tests, and a sufficiently coordinated TB control system. Additionally, Kimerling discusses that a disconnect between Russian ideals of proper TB management and the internationally prescribed standard TB therapy (DOTS therapy) has dampened control efforts. He notes that (with regard to short term standard therapy solutions) "the term 'short' has a negative association and is not felt appropriate [by Russian TB protocol]", and that "the term 'standard' can be interpreted or translated as rule or regulation in the Russian language, resulting in negative connotations by limiting a physician's right to take an individual approach to patient care".

== See also ==
- Russian criminal tattoos
- Gulag - the prison camp system of the USSR
- Thief in law
- Prisoners' Union (Russia) - A Russian human rights organization
- Political prisoners in Russia
