= Corrective labor colony =

Type of prison in post-Soviet states

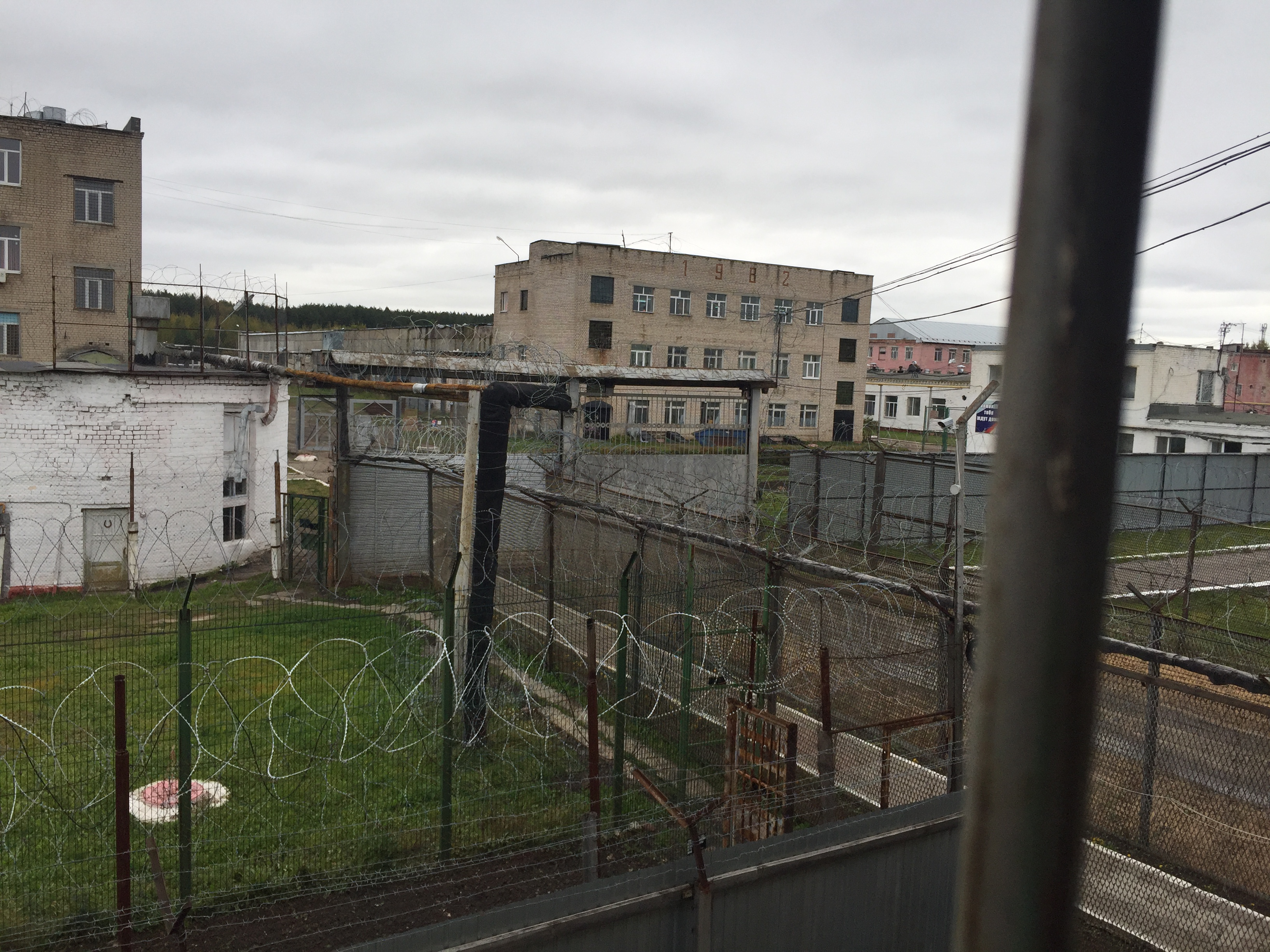
Strict regime corrective colony in Kokhma, Ivanovo Oblast

A corrective colony (Russian: исправительная колония, romanized: ispravitelnaya koloniya, abbr. ИК/IK) is one of the most common type of prison in Russia and some other post-Soviet countries. Such colonies combine detention with penal labor. The system of labor colonies and camps originated in 1929, and after 1953, the corrective penal colonies in the Soviet Union developed as a post-Stalin replacement of the Gulag labor camp system.

== Soviet Union ==
In the Soviet Union, the labor colonies were governed by the Corrective Labor Law (Исправительно-Трудовой Кодекс).

The Corrective labor Law of 1933 defined different types of labor colonies (Фабрично-заводские и сельскохозяйственные исправительно-трудовые колонии, Исправительно-трудовые колонии массовых работ, Штрафные исправительно-трудовые колонии).

In the late Soviet Union, the labor colonies were governed by Article 11 of the Corrective Labor Law and were intended for adult (16 years and over) convicts. The colonies were classified according to the regimen of severity: ordinary, reinforced, strict, and special regimens (колонии общего, усиленного, строгого, особого режимов), as well as the "colony-settlements" (колонии-поселения). Only ordinary and strict regimens (and colony-settlements) were provided for female convicts.

"Colony-settlements" were establishments introduced in the 1960s for convicts with good behavior who served at least half of the term for those eligible for parole and who served two thirds of the term and not eligible for parole. The inmates live without guard but under observation and may move relatively freely and have family.

== Russia ==
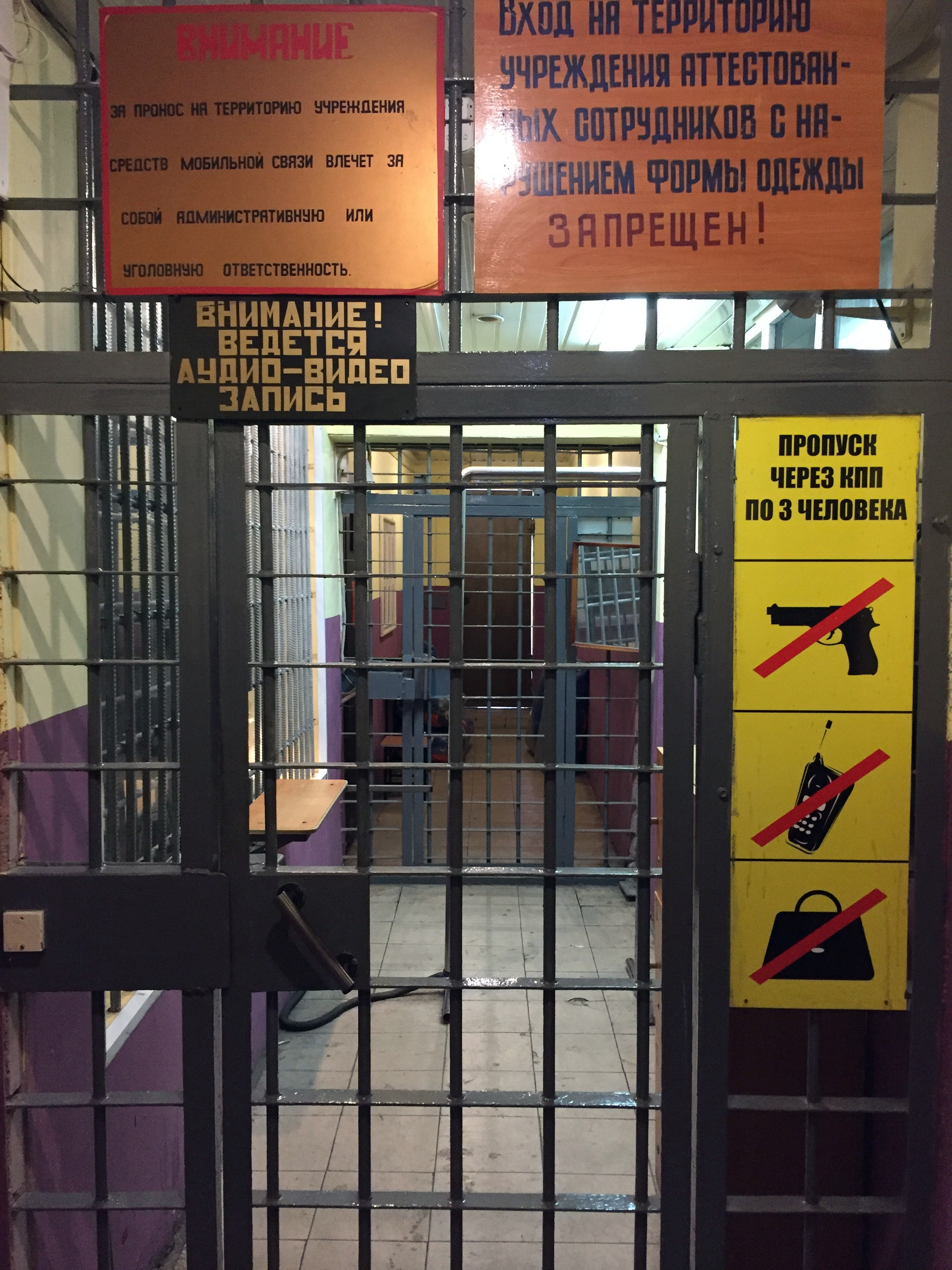
Checkpoint at a strict regime colony

Of the four types of facilities of prisons in Russia, the corrective colony (ispravitelnie kolonii or IK) is the most common, with 760 institutions in 2004 across the many administrative divisions of Russia. In 2012, the Russian Federal Penitentiary Service reported that 585,000 prisoners were serving sentences at penal colonies, more than the 260,000 prisoners held in detention centers.

Corrective colony regimes are categorized as very strict/special, strict, general, and open. The detachment (отряд or otryad) is the basic unit of the prison. When not in the detachment, prisoners are required to participate in penal labor, which is in the form of work brigades in colony production zones where prisoners earn a wage of which most is paid to the colony for their upkeep.

The detachment is largely self-organized, with the prison administration designating the "head monitor" with the job of keeping order and to liaise with the prison administration, and is supported by various prisoners' committees responsible for health and safety, cleanliness, energy saving, and also psychological counselling. Female detachments organize cultural and social activities, including annual beauty pageants (called by such names as "Miss Colony" and "Miss Personality"). Women's colonies are equipped with childcare facilities for the prisoners' children. As of 1 August 2020, there are 13 such facilities in Russia, caring for of 384 children in total.

The conditions of prisons have been criticized by former prisoners and human rights activists.

=== Examples ===
- Corrective colony No. 2, Vladimir Oblast (IK-2)
- Corrective colony No. 2, Mordovia, women's corrective colony, Yavas
- White Swan (prison) (ФКУ ИК-2) Solikamsk, Perm Krai
- FKU IK-3, Kharp
- Lgov Prison, IK-3, Lgov, Kursk Oblast
- Corrective colony No. 5, Vologda Oblast (IK-5/ "Vologda Fiver", situated on Ognenny Ostrov)
- Corrective colony No. 6, Vladimir Oblast (IK-6 Melekhovo/ Melekhovo correctional colony)
- Corrective colony No. 6, Khabarovsk Krai "Snowflake"
- Corrective colony No. 11, Mordovia, (ФКУ ИК-11) men's corrective colony, Yavas
- Corrective colony No. 13, Sverdlovsk Oblast "Red Duck"
- Corrective colony No. 56, Sverdlovsk Oblast "Black Berkut" (Black Asian golden eagle)

== See also ==
- Penal colony
