= Snowflake (prison) =

Federal prison in Russia

- Location within Khabarovsk Krai Location within Russia
- Location: Elban, Khabarovsk Krai, Russia; 50.1037°N 136.5065°E
- Status: Operational
- Capacity: 378
- Population: 250
- Opened: 2017
- Managed by: Federal Penitentiary Service
- Governor: lieutenant colonel Andrey Kuzmin

Federal Governmental Institution — penal colony No. 6 of the Federal Penitentiary Service of Russia in Khabarovsk Krai, commonly known as the Snowflake (Russian: Снежинка, Snezhinka), is a prison in Elban, Khabarovsk Krai, Russia. It is a supermax corrective labor colony operated by the Federal Penitentiary Service for convicts sentenced to life imprisonment. The Snowflake appears to be the newest prison of the seven prisons of this type in Russia.

The Snowflake became the first and only prison for life prisoners in the Far East. In 1996, the construction of a pre-trial detention center with a capacity of 800 beds was started in its place. The facility was completed in 2012, put into operation in early 2014. The nickname of the prison comes from the seven-beam shape of its buildings.

In July 2017, the Federal Penitentiary Service for the Khabarovsk Krai reported that the insulator would be reclassified into a prison for life convicts. On September 20, the institution started working as a corrective labor colony and began receiving the first prisoners who were brought from other penitentiary institutions in Russia (mainly from the closing BlackBerkut penal colony. Sewing and woodworking workshops have appeared on the territory of the prison. As of November 2017, there were 23 people in the Snowflake, and by June 2020 the number had risen to 250.

== Notable inmates ==
- Nikolai Chigirinsky, serial killer and child rapist
- Yevgeny Chuplinsky, serial killer
- Dmitry Dilschneider, serial killer and robber
- Stepan Komarov, mass murderer
- Yevgeny Krasnoyarov, serial killer and neo-Nazi
- Dmitry Lebed, serial killer and rapist
- Vladimir Mirgorod, serial killer and rapist
- Yuri Stepanov, serial killer
