= Yevgeny Krasnoyarov =

Russian serial killer (born 1972)

- Born: Yevgeny Valeryevich Krasnoyarov; 1972 (age 53–54); Chita, Chita Oblast, RSFSR (present-day Chita, Zabaykalsky Krai, Russia)
- Other name: "The Ripper of Tajiks"
- Convictions: Murder x6 Attempted murder x8 Possession of illegal weaponry
- Penalty: Life imprisonment

Details
- Victims: 6
- Span of crimes: 2006–2016
- Country: Russia
- State: Zabaykalsky
- Date apprehended: 2017
- Imprisoned at: Snezhinka Colony, Elban, Khabarovsk Krai

Yevgeny Valeryevich Krasnoyarov (Russian: Евгений Валерьевич Краснояров; born 1972), known as The Ripper of Tajiks (Russian: Потрошитель таджиков), is a Russian serial killer and Neo-Nazi who murdered six people and harmed eight others in Chita, Zabaykalsky Krai, from 2006 to 2016. Most of the killings were committed on ethnic grounds, with him claiming that he wanted to rid the country of foreign drug dealers.

For his crimes, Krasnoyarov was convicted and sentenced to life imprisonment.

== Early life ==
Yevgeny Krasnoyarov was born in 1972 in Chita, Chita Oblast. Little is known about his childhood, but by the 1990s, he was involved with several criminal gangs in the Transbaikal region. He eventually defected to a gang run by businessman Valery Torgaev, for whom he worked as a bodyguard until the latter died in an accident during the mid-2000s.

Following Torgaev's death, Krasnoyarov ascended the ranks and quickly garnered a reputation for his bloodthirstiness and hatred towards those he considered "non-Russians". Aside from this, he worked in a sports company, was considered one of the country's most skilled masters of the Arnis martial art and was known for his skilled usage of knives.

== Murders ==
In July 2006, Krasnoyarov was at an intersection leading towards Khabarovsk and Zabaykalsk when he noticed two Uzbekistani men selling fruit by the road. He then pulled out a IZH-79-8 and shot the two men non-fatally before speeding away.

His next known crime occurred six years later when he went to the house of a local Romani people family in Chita. Krasnoyarov threw a Molotov cocktail at the house and then opened fire on them with his pistol. No casualties were reported, but the father suffered a wound to the neck and his 11-year-old daughter also suffered some sort of injury.

In May 2013, he went to the village of Peschanka and burst into a house he had selected beforehand. He then opened fire on the occupants with an AK-47, killing two Uzbek nationals and two Russian women who had been visiting them. In November and December of that year, Krasnoyarov attacked two fruit vendors in Chita, shooting them with his pistol. One of the victims was seriously injured, but both survived the attacks.

In January, together with several accomplices, he burgled a house in Chita's central district, robbing the residence of approximately 6.5 million rubles and shooting the occupant in both legs. Shortly afterwards, Krasnoyarov shot a Tajikistani fruit vendor four times at point-blank range, killing him instantly. His last known murder occurred in July when he killed motorist Roman Chipizubov on Gagarin Street after the pair got into some sort of argument.

== Arrest, trial, and imprisonment ==
Only a month after the final murder, local authorities gathered enough evidence to link all of the crimes to Krasnoyarov and subsequently arrested him. His property was raided, leading to the discovery of several caches of military-grade weaponry he had acquired following Torgaev's death. According to the press, it included two AK-47s; two IZH-79-8s converted to fire live ammunition; a Makarov and MCM pistol; a PP-93; a .12 calibre sawed-off shotgun; TNT; two grenades and a large amount of ammo for all the aforementioned weapons.

Krasnoyarov was charged with six counts of murder and seven counts of attempted murder. His trial - which began in June 2018 - was considered one of the most high-profile cases to have occurred in the Zabaykalsky Krai in recent memory. Krasnoyarov claimed that he was innocent and that he had an alibi, but this was contradicted by many eyewitness accounts and physical evidence that matched him to the killings. It was alleged that Krasnoyarov believed most of his victims to be drug dealers but no evidence confirming these assumptions has been found.

Krasnoyarov was eventually found guilty on all counts and sentenced to life imprisonment, in addition to being fined 4.5 million rubles as restitution for the victims' families. He filed an appeal to the Supreme Court, but it was rejected.

=== Detention ===
After his conviction, Krasnoyarov was transferred to the Snezhinka Colony in Elban, Khabarovsk Krai. In 2019, a documentary crew who went to film an interview with another prisoner learned that Krasnoyarov, who refused to communicate with reporters and cussed them out, was considered so dangerous that he was the only prisoner in the colony whose handcuffs are not removed by prison staff when he's outside the cell.

In December 2022, reporters for Gazeta Vechorka claimed that representatives of the Wagner Group had recently visited the Snezhinka Colony and reportedly showed interest in recruiting Krasnoyarov to fight in the ongoing conflict between Russia and Ukraine. As of March 2023, this claim remains unverified.

== See also ==
- List of Russian serial killers
