= IK-2 =

IK-2 can mean:

- Ikarus IK-2, a 1930s Yugoslav fighter aircraft
- Corrective colony No. 2, Vladimir Oblast, a prison in Vladimir Oblast, Russia
- Corrective colony No. 2, Mordovia, a women's prison in Russia
