= Vladimir Mirgorod =

Russian serial killer and rapist (born 1979)

- Born: Vladimir Viktorovich Mirgorod; 1 November 1979 (age 47); Moscow, RSFSR
- Other names: "The Strangler" "The Neat Maniac"
- Conviction: Murder
- Penalty: Life imprisonment

Details
- Victims: 33+
- Span of crimes: 2000–2004
- Country: Russia
- State: Moscow
- Date apprehended: 2010
- Imprisoned at: Snowflake, Elban, Khabarovsk Krai

Vladimir Viktorovich Mirgorod (Russian: Владимир Викторович Миргород; born 1 November 1979), known as The Strangler (Russian: Душитель), is a Russian serial killer who killed 33 people from 2000 to 2004. He was detained in 2010 when his fingerprints matched with those found at the crime scenes. In 2012, he was sentenced to life imprisonment.

== Biography ==
Mirgorod was born in Moscow in 1979. He lived in the Timiryazevsky District, in the metro area Petrovsko-Razumovskaya. After finishing school, he entered MISiS, but left soon after finding a good job. His friends spoke only positively of him.

Mirgorod committed the first murder in January 2003, killing a 25-year-old from Minsk in her own apartment, stealing valuables from her house. Her body was found on 18 January. In March 2003, he raped and strangled a 22-year-old visitor from Omsk, and a few days later, Mirgorod raped and strangled a 20-year-old girl in the surrounding forest region. On 18 April, he killed a 33-year-old woman named Natalia Kurochkina, coming from Novosibirsk, and on 1 July, he raped and strangled a 28-year-old woman in the Botanical Garden. Three days later, he killed a 23-year-old girl. On 21 July, Mirgorod killed a 50-year-old woman and her 15-year-old son. Despite the last double murder being different from the others, police did not rule out the possibility of a serial killer.

At the end of 2004, Mirgorod was arrested for the rape and robbery of a woman, for which he served a prison sentence from January 2005 to July 2010 based on the court decision made at the Preobrazhensky District Court. At the end of 2010, Mirgorod was released, but when his fingerprints were registered in the database, a match was found to those found at the murder sites. Initially, he confessed to eight murders, but a subsequent genetic examination proved his involvement in a total of 16 murders. In 2012, Mirgorod was sentenced to life imprisonment, with the Supreme Court of Russia leaving his sentence unchanged. Mirgorod was transferred to the Black Berkut colony in the Sverdlovsk Oblast but later moved to the Snowflake Prison in Khabarovsk Krai.

Between May and July 2024, Mirgorod was linked to two additional murders committed in 2003 and 2004, respectively. The first of these occurred on 6 April 2003, when he met a 16-year-old teenager named Irina at Vodny Stadion and accompanied her to her apartment, where he raped and tortured her with an unidentified object before strangling her and setting the apartment on fire. The other murder occurred in April 2004, when he raped and strangled 33-year-old Larisa with a belt in a house on Lavochkin Street.

== See also ==
- List of Russian serial killers
- List of serial killers by number of victims
