= Chigirinsky =

Chigirinsky is an English form or two Russian surnames (Russian: Чигиринских or Russian: Чигиринский). The surnames are related to Ukrainian city Chyhyryn, in Russian Chigirin. Notable people with the surname include:

- Nikolai Chigirinsky (born 1983), Russian serial killer
- Shalva Chigirinsky (born 1949), Israeli-Russian businessman
