= Black Berkut =

Federal prison in Russia

Black Eagle
- Interactive map of Black Eagle
- Location: Lozvinsky, Ivdel, Sverdlovsk Oblast, Russia; 60°53′57.3″N 60°27′16″E
- Status: closed
- Capacity: 962
- Opened: 1935
- Closed: 2019
- Managed by: Federal Penitentiary Service

Federal Governmental Institution — correctional colony No. 56 OIK-2 OUKHD Federal Penitentiary Service of Russia in Sverdlovsk Oblast, (Russian: Федеральное казённое учреждение «Исправительная колония № 56 Управления Федеральной службы исполнения наказаний по Свердловской области») popularly known as Black Berkut (Note: Berkut is a bird of prey) (Russian: Чёрный беркут), was a prison in Ivdel, Sverdlovsk Oblast, Russia. It was a maximum-security Supermax prison operated by the Federal Penitentiary Service for convicts sentenced to life imprisonment.

The head of the colony (as of November 2018) is Colonel of the Internal Service Dadashov Subhan Dadashbala oglu. The filling limit is 499 places, including the colony-settlement section with 40 places.

In Soviet times, this was the only colony in which criminals sentenced to an exceptional sentence of imprisonment (IMN) were serving their sentences, by which the execution was replaced by a 20-year imprisonment in the colony of a special (the most severe in the USSR) regime. With the advent of life sentences in the colony, an additional building was opened. The "Black Golden Eagle" is divided into two parts. One contains those who have been sentenced for serious crimes to 20–25 years in prison, the other contains those sentenced to life imprisonment. In 2011, it was planned to build a new building for life prisoners, designed for 300 places. In 2019 the prison was closed.

== Notable inmates ==
- Vladimir Belov
- Vladimir Krishtopa
- Vladimir Mirgorod
- Anatoly Sedykh
- Nikolai Chigirinsky
- Dmitry Dilschneider
- Dmitry Golubev

== See also ==
- Inmates of the Black Eagle
