= Supermax prison =

Most secure levels of custody in the prison systems of certain countries

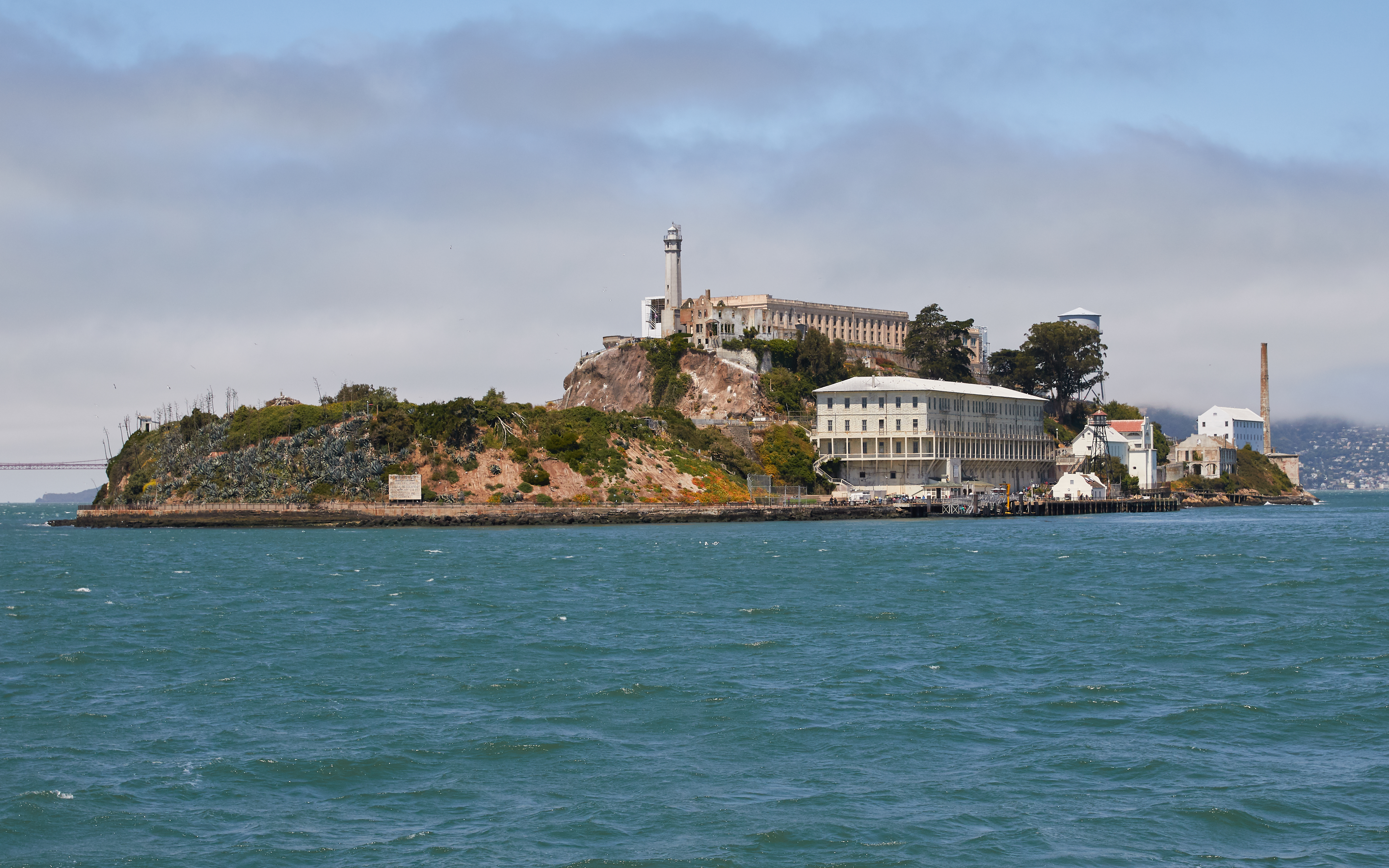
Alcatraz Island, one of the most infamous supermax prisons in the United States

A super-maximum security (supermax) or administrative maximum (ADX) prison is a "control-unit" prison, or a unit within prisons, which represents the most secure level of custody in the prison systems of certain countries.

The objective is to provide long-term, segregated housing for inmates classified as the highest security risks in the prison system and those who pose an extremely serious threat to both national and global security.

== Characteristics and practices ==
According to the National Institute of Corrections, an agency of the United States government, "a supermax is a stand-alone unit or part of another facility and is designated for violent or disruptive incarcerated individuals. It typically involves up to 23-hour-per-day solitary confinement for an indefinite period of time. Those incarcerated in supermax housing have minimal contact with staff and other inmates", a definition confirmed by a majority of prison wardens.

In 2001, academics Leena Kurki and Norval Morris wrote that there was no universal, agreed upon definition for "supermax" and that prisons are classified inconsistently. They identified four general features of supermax prisons:

1. Long-term: once transferred to a supermax prison, incarcerated individuals tend to stay there for several years or indefinitely.
2. Powerful administration: the supermax staff have ample authority to punish and manage incarcerated individuals, without outside review or prisoner grievance systems.
3. Solitary confinement: supermax prisons rely heavily on intensive (and long-term) solitary confinement, which is used to isolate and punish prisoners as well as to protect them from themselves and each other. Communication with outsiders is minimal to none.
4. Very limited activities: few opportunities are provided for recreation, education, substance abuse programs, or other activities generally considered healthy and rehabilitative at other prisons.

Before the Trump administration ordered former federal death row inmates to supermax prisons, those who were in a supermax prison were placed not as a punishment of their crimes but by their previous history when incarcerated or based on reliable evidence of an impending disruption, such as a gang leader or the leader of a radical movement. These decisions are made as administrative protection measures and the prisoners in a supermax are deemed by correctional workers as a threat to the safety and security of the institution itself.

The amount of programming for those in prison varies from jurisdiction to jurisdiction. Certain jurisdictions provide entertainment for their incarcerated population in the form of television, educational and self-help programs. Others provide instructors who speak through the cell door to individuals who are incarcerated. Some jurisdictions provide no programming to its incarcerated population. In a supermax, incarcerated people are generally allowed out of their cells for only one hour a day (one-and-a-half hours in California state prisons). Exercise is done in indoor spaces or small, secure, outdoor spaces, usually alone or in a pair and always watched by correctional officers. Group exercise is offered only to those who are in transition programs.

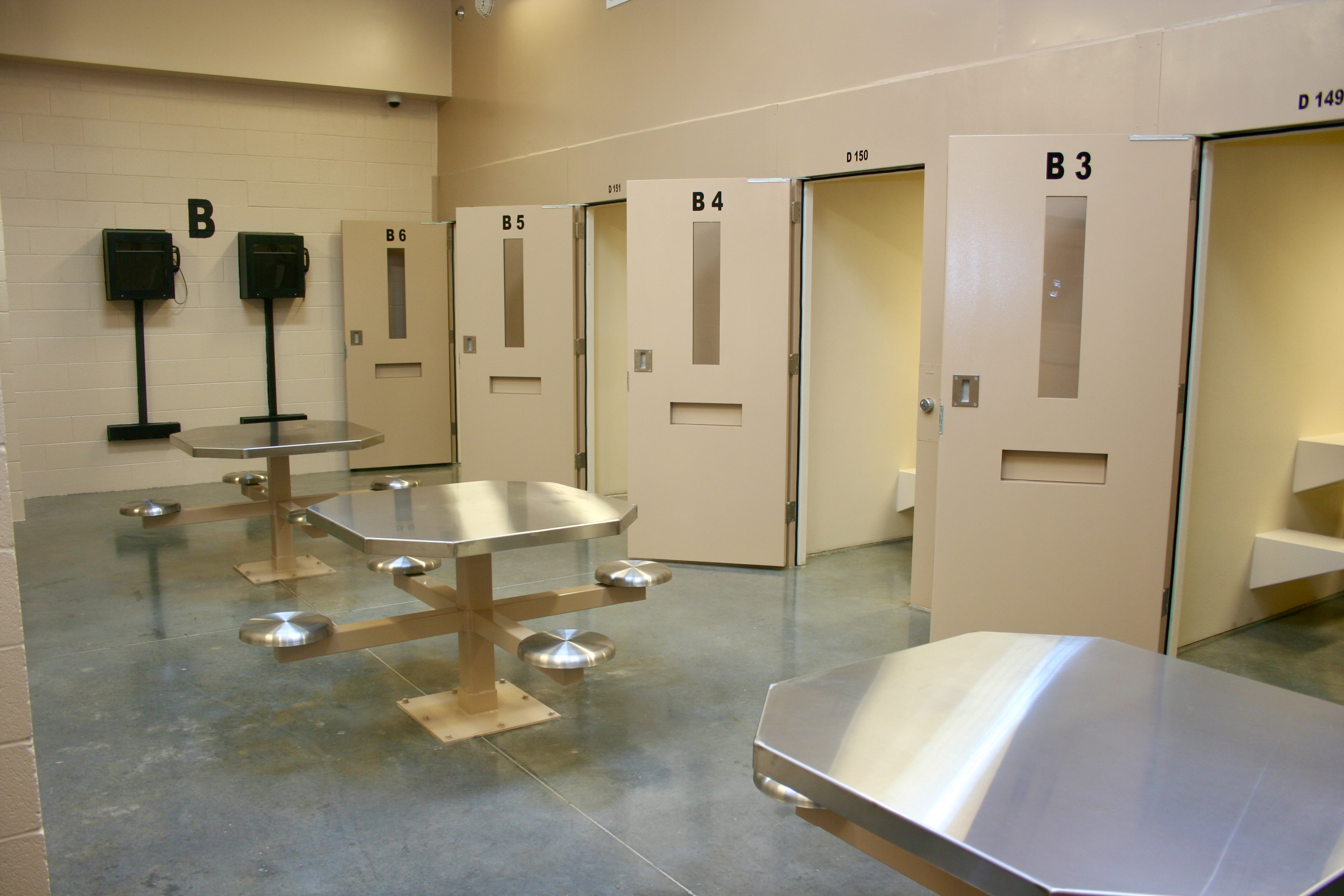
High-security cells at a prison in the United States.

Prisoners receive their meals through ports in the doors of their cells. People in these prisons are also under constant surveillance, usually with CCTV cameras. Cell doors are usually opaque, while the cells may be windowless. Furnishings are plain, with poured concrete or metal furniture. Cell walls, and sometimes plumbing, may be soundproofed to prevent communication between people.

Supermax and Security Housing Unit (SHU) prisons are controversial. One criticism is that the living conditions in such facilities violate the United States Constitution, specifically, the Eighth Amendment's proscription against "cruel and unusual" punishments. A 2011 New York Bar Association comprehensive study suggested that supermax prisons constitute "torture under international law" and "cruel and unusual punishment under the U.S. Constitution". In 2012, a federal class action suit against the Federal Bureau of Prisons and officials who run ADX Florence SHU (Bacote v. Federal Bureau of Prisons, Civil Action 1:12-cv-01570) alleged chronic abuse, failure to properly diagnose prisoners, and neglect of prisoners who are seriously mentally ill.

== History ==
=== Australia ===
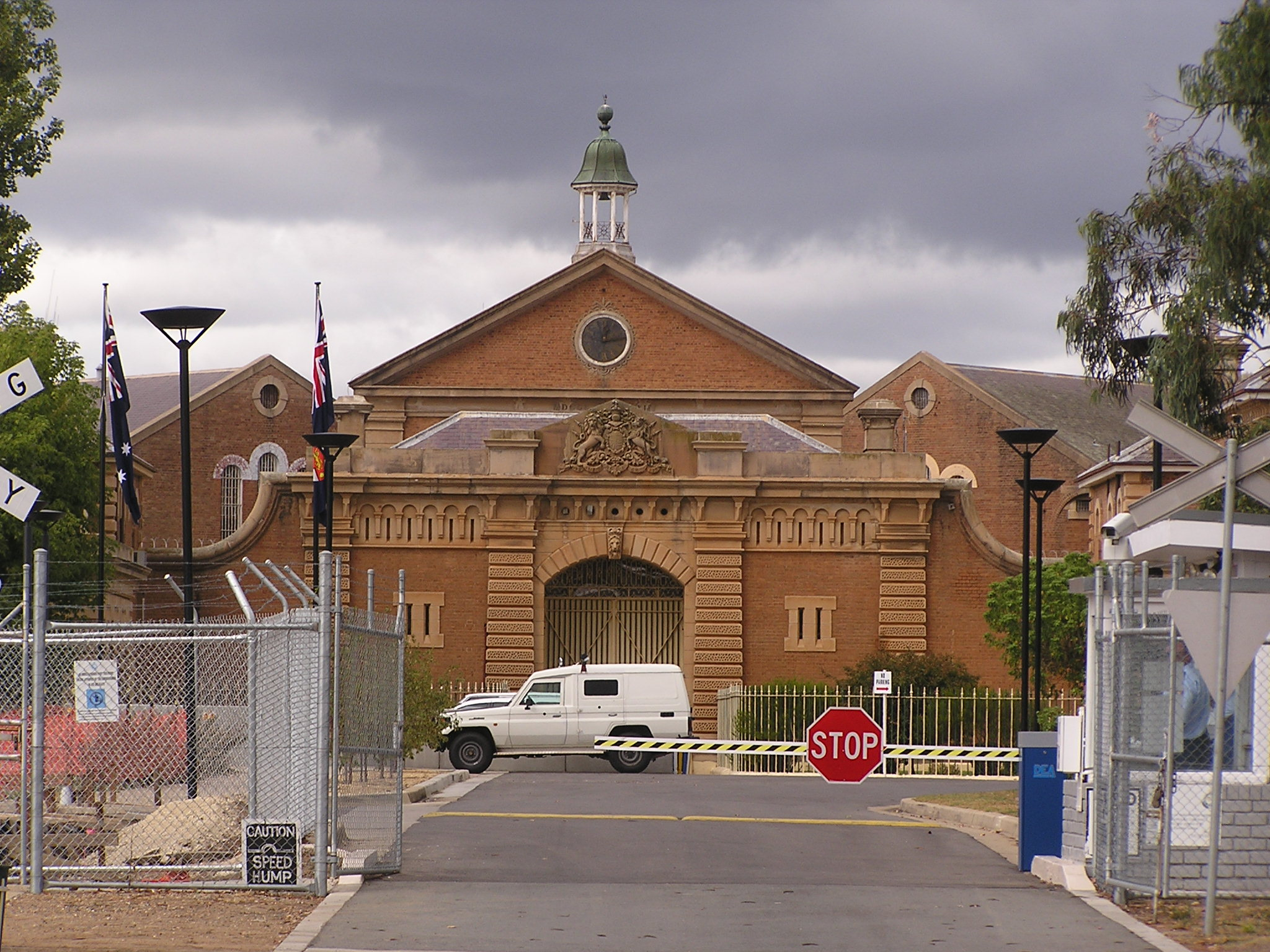
The Goulburn Gaol Centre in Goulburn, New South Wales. It is one of two prisons with supermax units in the country.

An early form of supermax-style prison unit appeared in Australia in 1975, when "Katingal" was built inside the Long Bay Correctional Centre in Sydney. Dubbed the "electronic zoo" by inmates, Katingal was a super-maximum security prison block with 40 prison cells having electronically operated doors, surveillance cameras, and no windows. It was closed down two years later over human rights concerns. Since then, some maximum-security prisons have gone to full lockdown as well, while others have been built and dedicated to the supermax standard. In September 2001, the Australian state of New South Wales opened a facility in the Goulburn Correctional Centre to the supermax standard. While its condition is an improvement over that of Katingal of the 1970s, this new facility is nonetheless designed on the same principle of sensory deprivation. It has been set up for "AA" prisoners who have been deemed a risk to public safety and the instruments of government and civil order or are believed to be beyond rehabilitation. Corrections Victoria in the state of Victoria also operates the Acacia and Melaleuca units at Barwon Prison which serve to hold the prisoners requiring the highest security in that state including Melbourne Gangland figures such as Tony Mokbel, and Carl Williams, who was murdered in the Acacia unit in 2010.

=== Brazil ===
In 1985, the state government of São Paulo created an annex to a psychiatric penitentiary hospital meant to house the most violent inmates of the region and established the Penitentiary of Rehabilitation Center of Taubaté, also known as Piranhão. Previously, high-risk inmates were housed at a prison on Anchieta Island; however, that closed down after a bloody massacre. At Taubaté, inmates spent 23 hours each day in solitary confinement and 30 minutes each day with a small group of seven to ten inmates. Ill-treatment of inmates occurred on a daily basis, causing major psychological impairment.

Throughout the 1990s, and the early-2000s, Brazil faced major challenges with gang structures within its prisons. The gang Primeiro Comando da Capital (PCC) gained notoriety in the prison system and had new members joining within the prisons. Riots were a common occurrence and the gang culture became uncontrollable, leading authorities to pass the controversial Regime Disciplinar Diferenciado (RDD), a culture founded from disciplinary punishment.

=== Germany ===
Stammheim Prison, in Stuttgart, opened as a supermax-style prison in 1964, with an additional wing built in 1975 to house members of the far-left militant Red Army Faction. At the time, it was considered one of the most secure prisons in the world.

=== United Kingdom ===
His Majesty's Prison Service in England and Wales has had a long history in controlling prisoners that are high-risk. Prisoners are categorized into four main classifications (A, B, C, D) with A being "highly dangerous" with a high risk of escaping to category D in which inmates "can be reasonably trusted in open conditions."

The British government formed the Control Review Committee in 1984 to allow for regulating long-term disruptive prisoners. The committee proposed special units (called CRC units) which were formally introduced in 1989 to control for highly-disruptive prisoners to be successfully reintegrated. Yet a series of escapes, riots, and investigations by authorities saw the units come to a close in 1998. They were replaced by Close Supervision Centres (CSC). It was reported to hold 60 of the most dangerous men in the UK in 2015. HM Prison Belmarsh has a High-Security Unit that can hold up to 48 prisoners. The prisoners are those of greatest risk of escape, terrorism, radicalising other prisoners or continuing organised crime from within the prison.

=== United States ===
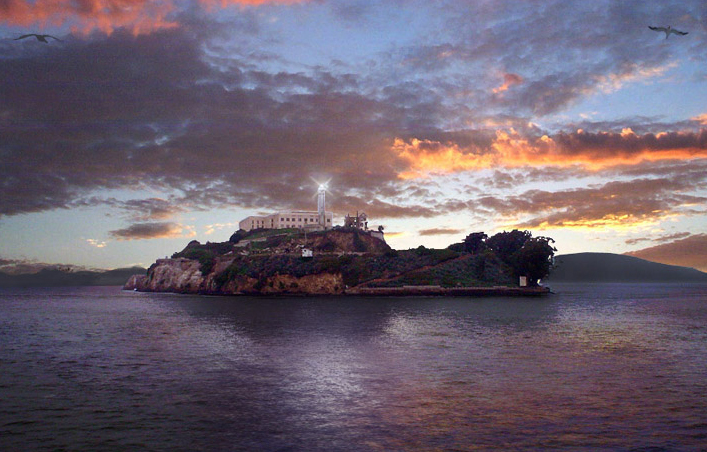
Alcatraz Island is a historical prototype of the supermax prison standard.

The United States Penitentiary Alcatraz Island, opened in 1934, has been considered a prototype and early standard for a supermax prison. A push for supermax prisons began in 1983, after two correctional officers, Merle Clutts and Robert Hoffman, were stabbed to death by inmates at Federal Penitentiary in Marion, Illinois. Norman Carlson, the director of the Federal Bureau of Prisons, argued for a new type of prison to isolate uncontrollable inmates who "show absolutely no concern for human life". USP Marion became the first "supermax" prison where inmates were isolated for 23 hours in their cells. By 1999, the United States contained at least 57 supermax facilities, spread across 30–34 states.

In recent years a number of U.S. states have downgraded their supermax prisons, as has been done with Wallens Ridge State Prison, a former supermax prison in Big Stone Gap, Virginia. Other supermax prisons that have gained notoriety for their harsh conditions and attendant litigation by inmates and advocates are the former Boscobel (in Wisconsin), now named the Wisconsin Secure Program Facility, Red Onion State Prison (in western Virginia, the twin to Wallens Ridge State Prison), Tamms (in Illinois), and the Ohio State Penitentiary. Placement policies at the Ohio facility were the subject of a U.S. Supreme Court case (Wilkinson v. Austin) in 2005 where the Court decided that there had to be some, but only very limited, due process involved in supermax placement.

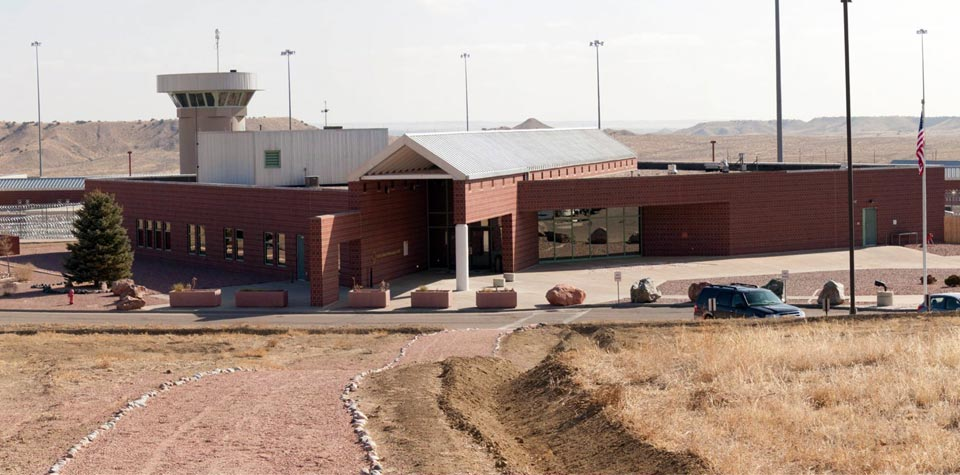
ADX Florence

There is only one supermax prison remaining in the U.S. federal prison system, ADX Florence in Florence, Colorado. It houses numerous inmates who have a history of violent behavior in other prisons, with the goal of moving them from solitary confinement (up to 23 hours a day) to a less restrictive prison within three years.

However, it is best known for housing several inmates who have been deemed either too dangerous, too high-profile or too great a national security risk for even a maximum-security prison. They include several prisoners convicted of domestic and international terrorism, such as Timothy McVeigh and Terry Nichols, who perpetrated the Oklahoma City Bombing; Richard Reid and Umar Farouk Abdulmutallab, who separately attempted to detonate explosives on a commercial airplane flight; and Dzhokhar Tsarnaev, convicted for the 2013 Boston Marathon bombing. Other notable inmates include Robert Hanssen, convicted of espionage for the Soviet Union and Joaquín "El Chapo" Guzmán, the head of the Mexican Sinaloa Cartel and the world's most powerful drug lord, convicted in 2019.

However, many states now have created supermax prisons, either as stand-alone facilities or as secure units within lower-security prisons. State supermax prisons include Pelican Bay in California and Tamms in Illinois. In 2006, USP Marion, the original model for the modern supermax prison, was downgraded to a medium-security prison. The California State Prison, Corcoran (COR) is a hybrid model, incorporating a supermax partition, housing or having housed high-security prisoners such as Charles Manson.

== Cost-benefit analysis of supermax prisons ==
There is no set definition of a supermax prison; however, the United States Department of Justice and the National Institute of Corrections do agree on their purpose: "these units have basically the same function: to provide long-term, segregated housing for inmates classified as the highest security risks in a state’s prison system."

=== Costs of operating a supermax prison ===
Building a supermax prison, or even retrofitting an existing prison, is expensive. Construction of ADX Florence cost $60 million (Note: Equivalent to over $110 million in 2021.) when it opened in 1994.

Compared to a maximum security facility, supermax prisons cost about three times more on average. The 1999 average annual cost for inmates at Colorado State Penitentiary, a supermax facility, was $32,383, compared with the annual inmate cost of $18,549 at the Colorado Correctional Center, a maximum-security prison; the cost of the latter facility being just 57% of the former. The increased cost is due to the technology needed to further maintain a supermax: high-security doors, fortified walls, and sophisticated electronic systems, and because more people must be hired to maintain the buildings and facilities.

== Prisons with supermax facilities ==
=== North America ===
==== Canada ====
- Special Handling Unit (Sainte-Anne-des-Plaines, Quebec) – Houses Canada's most dangerous and violent inmates

==== Mexico ====
- Penal del Altiplano – Almoloya de Juarez, State of Mexico. Full supermax and the only facility of this kind in Mexico.

==== United States ====
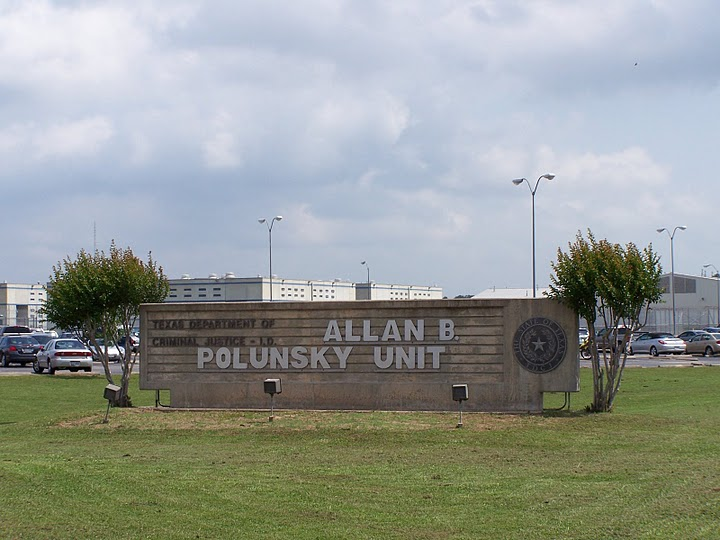
Allan B. Polunsky Unit houses State of Texas supermax units.

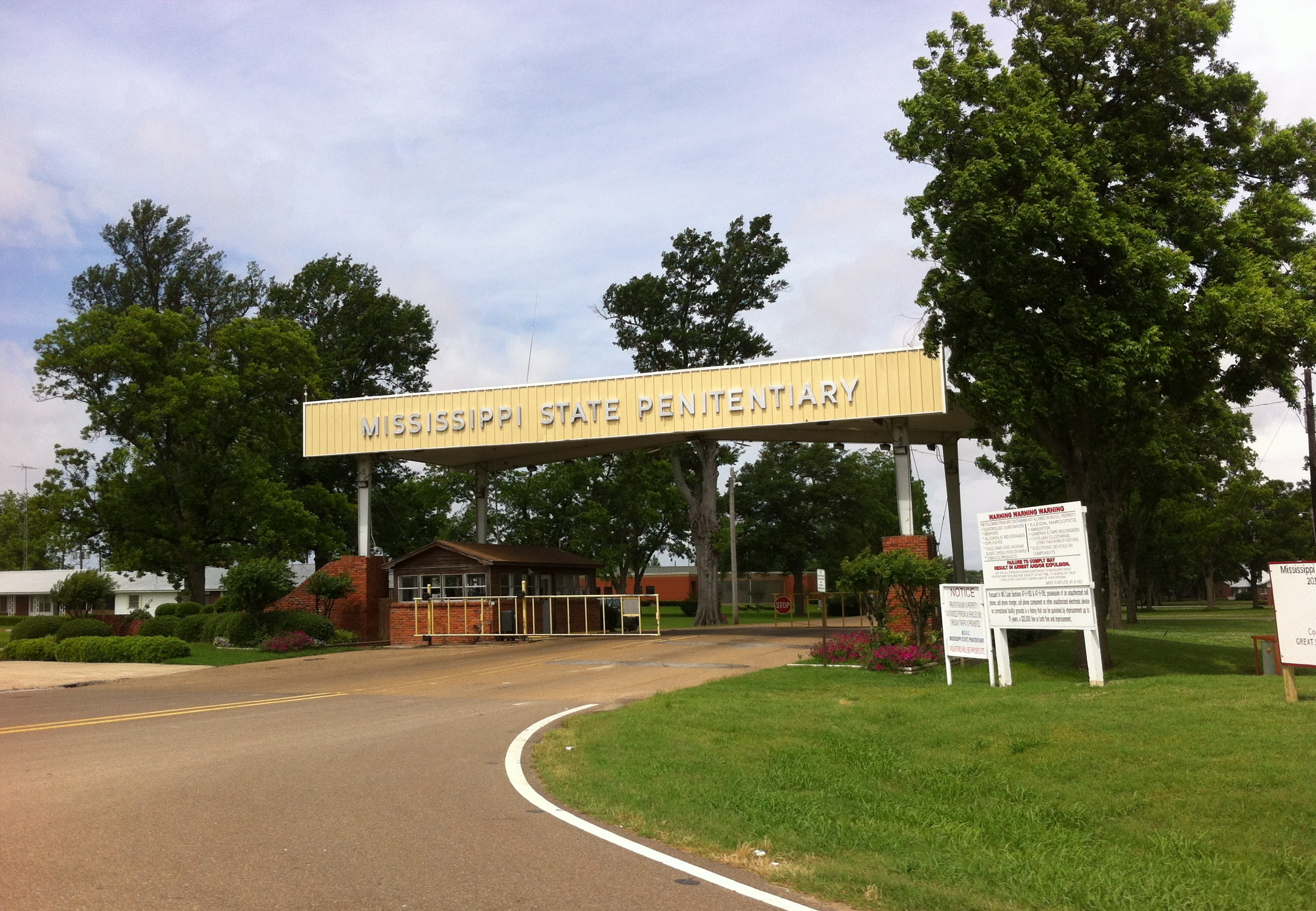
Mississippi State Penitentiary houses State of Mississippi supermax units.

Most of these facilities only contain maximum or high security wings or sections, with other parts of the facility under lesser security measures. Officially, there is only one federal supermax facility in the US (ADX Florence), others are high or maximum security.

- Alabama
  - Holman Correctional Facility – Atmore, Alabama
- Arizona
  - ASPC-Eyman, SMU I – Florence, Arizona
  - ASPC-Eyman, Browning Unit (Previously SMU II) – Florence, Arizona
- Arkansas
  - Varner Supermax – Lincoln County, Arkansas
- California
  - Pelican Bay State Prison – Crescent City, California
  - United States Penitentiary, Alcatraz Island – San Francisco, California (Closed 21 March 1963)
  - California Correctional Institution – Tehachapi, California
  - High Desert State Prison – Susanville, California
- Colorado
  - Colorado State Penitentiary – Cañon City, Colorado
  - United States Penitentiary, Administrative Maximum Facility (USP Florence ADMAX) – Florence, Colorado
- Connecticut
  - Northern Correctional Institution – Somers, Connecticut (Closed June 2021)
- Florida
  - Florida State Prison – Raiford, Florida
- Georgia
  - Georgia Diagnostic and Classification State Prison (Hi-Max Unit)
- Idaho
  - Idaho Maximum Security Institution – Boise, Idaho
- Illinois
  - Tamms Correctional Center – Tamms, Illinois (Closed January 2013)
  - Menard Correctional Center – Chester, Illinois
- Indiana
  - Wabash Valley Correctional Facility – Carlisle, Indiana (SHU)
  - Westville Correctional Facility – Westville, Indiana (WCU)
- Kansas
  - United States Disciplinary Barracks – Fort Leavenworth, Kansas (military prison)
- Kentucky
  - Kentucky State Penitentiary – Eddyville, Kentucky (the only prison in Kentucky housing supermax units)
- Louisiana
  - Louisiana State Penitentiary – West Feliciana Parish, Louisiana
- Maine
  - Maine State Prison – Warren, Maine
- Maryland
  - Chesapeake Detention Facility – Baltimore, Maryland
  - North Branch Correctional Institution – Cumberland, Maryland (final housing unit began operation in summer of 2008)
- Massachusetts
  - Souza-Baranowski Correctional Center – Lancaster, Massachusetts
  - Massachusetts Correctional Institution – Cedar Junction – Walpole, Massachusetts (Closed 21 June 2023)
- Minnesota
  - Minnesota Correctional Facility – Oak Park Heights – Oak Park Heights, Minnesota (Although Oak Park Heights is classified as a Supermax, the majority of inmates are not housed in solitary confinement)
- Mississippi
  - Mississippi State Penitentiary – Sunflower County, Mississippi (Unit 32)
- Missouri
  - Jefferson City Correctional Center – Jefferson City, Missouri
  - Potosi Correctional Center – Mineral Point, Missouri
  - Southeast Correctional Center – Charleston, Missouri
  - South Central Correctional Center – Licking, Missouri
  - Chillicothe Correctional Center – Chillicothe, Missouri
- New Hampshire
  - New Hampshire State Prison for Men – Concord, New Hampshire
- New Jersey
  - New Jersey State Prison – Trenton, New Jersey
  - East Jersey State Prison – Woodbridge, New Jersey
  - Northern State Prison – Newark, New Jersey
  - Essex County Correctional Facility – Newark, New Jersey
- New Mexico
  - Penitentiary of New Mexico – unincorporated Santa Fe County, New Mexico – Uses the Bureau Classification System – Level 6 being Supermax
- New York
  - Attica Correctional Facility – Attica, New York
  - Five Points Correctional Facility – Romulus, New York
  - Sing Sing Correctional Facility – Ossining, New York
  - Southport Correctional Facility – Pine City, New York (Closed March 2022)
  - Upstate Correctional Facility – Malone, New York
- North Carolina
  - Polk Correctional Institution – Butner, North Carolina
- Ohio
  - Ohio State Penitentiary – Youngstown, Ohio
- Oklahoma
  - Oklahoma State Penitentiary – McAlester, Oklahoma
- Oregon
  - Oregon State Penitentiary – Salem, Oregon
- Pennsylvania
  - State Correctional Institution – Greene – Waynesburg, Pennsylvania
  - State Correctional Institution – Phoenix – Skippack Township, Pennsylvania
- South Carolina
  - Kirkland Correctional Institution – Columbia, South Carolina
- Tennessee
  - Riverbend Maximum Security Institution – Nashville, Tennessee
- Texas
  - Estelle High Security Unit – W.J. Estelle Unit – Walker County, Texas
  - Allan B. Polunsky Unit (formerly Terrell Unit) – West Livingston, Texas
  - Gib Lewis Unit High Security Expansion Cellblock "super seg" – Woodville, Texas
- Utah
  - Utah State Correctional Facility – Salt Lake City, Utah
- Virginia
  - Wallens Ridge State Prison – Big Stone Gap, Virginia
  - Red Onion State Prison – Wise County, Virginia
- Washington
  - Washington State Penitentiary – Walla Walla, Washington
- West Virginia
  - Mt. Olive Correctional Complex – Fayette County, West Virginia
- Wisconsin
  - Wisconsin Secure Program Facility – Boscobel, Wisconsin

=== Central America ===
==== El Salvador ====
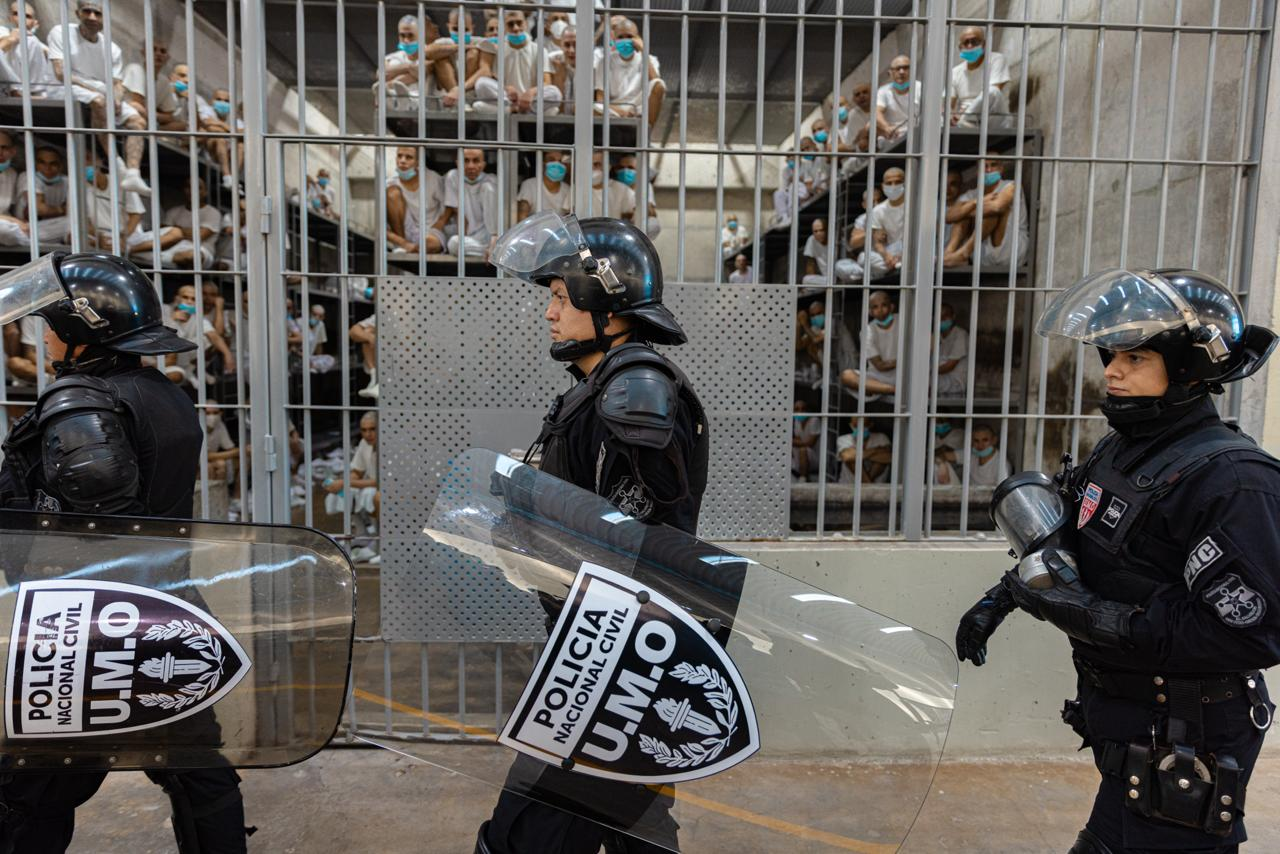
The CECOT prison, constructed in late 2022 during a large-scale gang crackdown in El Salvador

President of El Salvador Nayib Bukele, who came to power after winning the 2019 Salvadoran presidential election, announced a crackdown on gangs beginning in 2022. The Terrorism Confinement Center (CECOT), a supermax prison with a listed capacity of 40,000 inmates, was inaugurated on January 31, 2023 in Tecoluca, El Salvador, becoming the largest prison in not just Central America, but the whole of Latin America.

=== South America ===
==== Brazil ====
In Brazil, the "regime disciplinar diferenciado" (differentiated disciplinary regime), known by the acronym RDD, and strongly based on the Supermax standard, was created primarily to handle inmates who are considered capable of continuing to run their crime syndicate or to order criminal actions from within the prison system, when confined in normal maximum security prisons that allow contact with other inmates. Since its inception, the following prisons were prepared for the housing of RDD inmates:

- Presidente Bernardes Provisional Readaptation Center (Presidente Bernardes, São Paulo, Brazil) – inspired by the supermax standards, although prisoners can only stay there for a maximum of 2 years. Is a part of the prison system of the Brazilian State of São Paulo.
- Catanduvas Federal Penitentiary (Catanduvas, Paraná, Brazil) – also based on the supermax standards. It is the first federal prison in Brazil, designed to receive prisoners deemed too dangerous to be kept in the states' prison systems (in Brazil, ordinarily, both convicts sentenced by States' courts or by the Federal Judiciary fulfill their prison terms in state-run prisons; the Federal Prison System was created to handle only the most dangerous prisoners in Brazil, such as major drug lords, convicted either by the Federal Judiciary or by the judiciary of a state).
- Campo Grande Federal Penitentiary (Campo Grande, Mato Grosso do Sul, Brazil) – the second of two Brazilian Federal prisons based on the supermax specifications.

==== Colombia ====
- Penitenciaría de Cómbita (Colombia) – follows supermax specifications, hosts terrorists and drug lords.
- Establecimiento Penitenciario de Alta y Mediana Seguridad de Girón EPAMSGIRON.

=== Europe ===
- Leopoldov Prison – (Leopoldov, Slovakia) a 17th-century fortress built against Ottoman Turks that was converted into a high-security prison
- Portlaoise Prison (Portlaoise, Ireland) – One of the most secure prisons in Europe, protected full time by members of the Irish Defence Forces. Held many convicted IRA prisoners.
- Nieuw Vosseveld – Dutch High Security prison in Vught
- Stammheim Prison – German High Security Prison, partly purpose-built to keep Red Army Faction terrorists in the 1970s and 1980s.
- Politigårdens Fængsel – (Copenhagen – Denmark) There are 25 maximum security cells located in the prison of the central police station of Copenhagen
- Enner Mark Prison – (Horsens – Denmark) – High Security Prison. Holds many of Denmark's most dangerous criminals.
- Kumla Prison, Hall Prison, and Saltvik Prison – Sweden – All three prisons have a similar security unit called Fenix, which can house 24 inmates.
- Centre pénitentiaire de Vendin-le-Vieil – (Vendin-le-Vieil, France) – Upgraded in July 2025 into an ultra-high-security regime (QLCO) to hold top drug-trafficking leaders; first transfers in 31 July 2025.
- Centre pénitentiaire d'Alençon-Condé-sur-Sarthe – (Condé-sur-Sarthe, France) – Sister facility converted to the same high-security regime in mid-October 2025, dedicated to isolating cartel bosses and other top-risk inmates.

==== Russia ====
- Penal colony № 6 Federal Penitentiary Service – Sol-Iletsk – Russia – correctional facility in Sol-Iletsk, Orenburg Oblast, Russia, also known as Black Dolphin.
- Federal Governmental Institution – penal colony № 2 with special conditions of economic activity of the main directorate of the Federal Penitentiary Service of Russia in Perm Krai, also known as White Swan.
- Federal Governmental Institution – penal colony No. 18 of the Federal Penitentiary Service of Russia in Yamalo-Nenets Autonomous Okrug, commonly known as the Polar Owl.
- Federal Governmental Institution – penal colony No. 6 of the Federal Penitentiary Service of Russia in Khabarovsk Krai, commonly known as the Snowflake.
- Federal Governmental Institution – penal colony № 56 "Black Berkut" OIK-2 OUKHD Federal Penitentiary Service of Russia in Ivdel, Sverdlovsk Oblast, commonly known as Black Eagle. The prison was closed in 2019.

==== Italy ====
- Sassari District Prison "Giovanni Bacchiddu" at Bancali, Sardinia. The only Italian prison specially designed and built as a Supermax, housing about 90 super-high security criminals all subject to the provisions of the Article 41-bis prison regime, detained in self-contained sections, each with 4 cells, a small courtyard and a video-conference room where they can be interrogated and undergo trials without leaving the prison. This specially designed supermax has been built to replace the old maximum-security prison of the Asinara island, the so-called "Italian Alcatraz", that was closed in 2002.
- Another 10 Italian prisons have Supermax sections housing 41-bis inmates, besides the ordinary detention facilities, as follows:
  - L'Aquila District Prison – The largest Supermax section in Italy, housing over 150 inmates. Contains a section for female prisoners.
  - Cuneo District Prison – About 90 inmates.
  - Novara District Prison – About 90 inmates.
  - Parma District Prison – About 70 inmates.
  - Rebibbia District Prison, Rome – About 60 inmates – also contains a section for female prisoners.
  - Secondigliano District Prison "Pasquale Mandato", Naples – About 24 inmates.
  - Spoleto Detention Structure – About 80 inmates.
  - Terni District Prison – About 24 inmates.
  - Tolmezzo District Prison – About 24 inmates.
  - Viterbo District Prison "Mammagialla" – About 50 inmates.
- Another Supermax section was closed down during 2018.
  - Ascoli Piceno District Prison at Marino del Tronto.

==== United Kingdom ====
- Belmarsh – London, England – many of the terrorists of the 2006 transatlantic aircraft plot are imprisoned there.
- Frankland – Durham, England – High Security Prison with a special unit for prisoners suffering from Dangerous and Severe Personality Disorders.
- Full Sutton – East Yorkshire, England – High Security Prison.
- Long Lartin – Worcestershire, England – High Security Prison.
- Maghaberry – Lisburn, County Antrim, Northern Ireland – High Security Prison
- Manchester – Manchester, England – High Security Prison with a special unit for prisoners suffering from Dangerous and Severe Personality Disorders.
- Prison Shotts – Shotts, Lanarkshire, Scotland – High Security Prison. Holds some of the UK's most dangerous and violent criminals.
- Wakefield – West Yorkshire, England – High Security Prison with a 'Close Supervision Centre'. It is nicknamed "The Monster Mansion" due to the many high-profile convicted murderers incarcerated there.
- Whitemoor – March, Cambridgeshire, England – houses up to 500 of the most dangerous criminals in the UK. It has a unit known as the 'Close Supervision Centre' which is referred to as a "Prison inside a Prison". It has a special unit for prisoners with Dangerous and Severe Personality Disorders.
- Woodhill – Milton Keynes, Buckinghamshire, England – High Security Prison with a specialist 'Close Supervision Centre'.

=== Africa ===
- C Max (Pretoria, South Africa) – for violent and disruptive prisoners.
- Ebongweni Super Maximum Correctional Centre (Kokstad, South Africa) - Houses maximum-security inmates, managing them under closed-maximum principles.
- Scorpion Prison (Cairo, Egypt) – Supermax prison located inside the Tora Prison complex.

=== Asia ===
- Gyeongbuk Northern the Second Correctional Center (Prison), Cheongsong, Gyeongsangbuk-do, South Korea
- KEMTA, Taiping, Perak Malaysia
- Al Hayer Prison (Riyadh, Saudi Arabia)
- Bilibid Prison (Manila, Philippines) – Large maximum security prison with around 17,000–20,000 convicted prisoners.
- Nusa Kambangan Correctional Facility, Central Java, Indonesia – Supermax prison built during the Dutch era, now under the jurisdiction of Ministry of Law and Human Rights
- Black Dolphin – Russian maximum-security prison for convicts sentenced to life imprisonment.
- White Swan – Russian maximum-security prison for convicts sentenced to life imprisonment.
- Al-Muwaqqar II Correctional and Rehabilitation Center, Jordan – Supermax prison with 240 cells, designed to hold incorrigibly violent inmates in separate isolation cells.
- Khao Bin Central Prison, Ratchaburi, Thailand – Supermax facility being opened in the first half of 2014.

=== Australia ===
- Goulburn Correctional Centre – Full Supermax prison, the highest level of security in Australia – 75-bed centre, (Goulburn, New South Wales).
- Casuarina Prison – Special Handling Unit (SHU) (Perth, Western Australia)
- Risdon Prison Complex – 8 cell Tamar Unit (Risdon Vale, Tasmania)
- His Majesty's Prison Barwon – Barwon Supermax (Lara, Victoria)
- Port Phillip Prison – Charlotte unit (Truganina, Victoria) (Closed December 2025)
- Brisbane Correctional Centre – 18-cell Maximum Security Unit (Brisbane, Queensland)
- Alexander Maconochie Centre – 12-cell Supermax Section (Hume, Australian Capital Territory)
- Yatala Labour Prison – G Division (Northfield, South Australia)
- Alice Springs Correctional Centre – 12-cell Supermax Unit (Alice Springs, Northern Territory)

== See also ==
- List of prisons
- Penology
- Panopticon
- Solitary confinement
- Incarceration in the United States (security levels)
- Article 41-bis prison regime the Italian high security treatment for Mafiosi and terrorists
- Prisoner security categories in the United Kingdom
- F-type Prisons (Turkey)
- Black Dolphin Prison
