= Yuzhno-Sakhalinsk cathedral shooting =

2014 Mass shooting in Yuzhno-Sakhalinsk, Russia

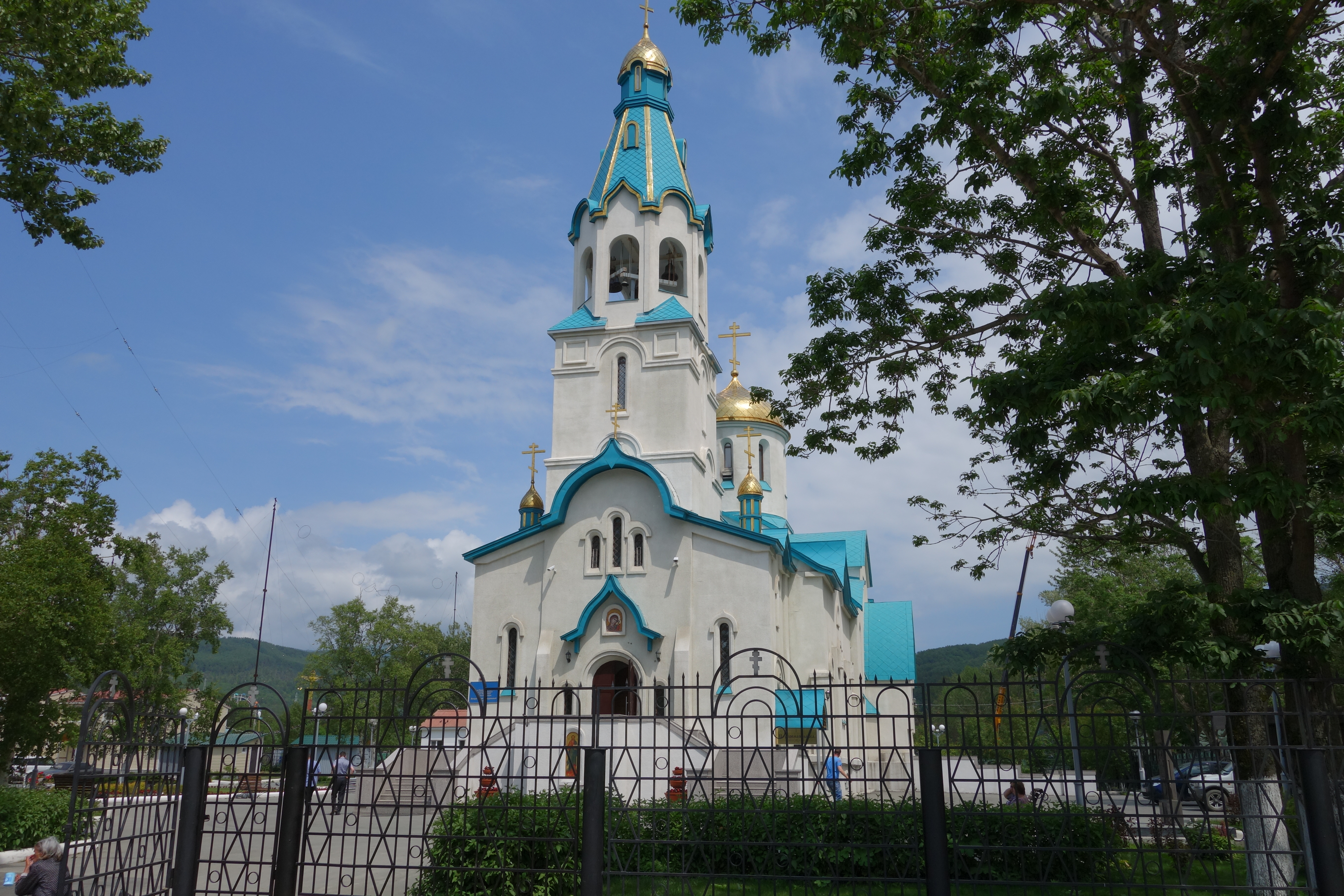
- The Resurrection Cathedral in June 2014

- Yuzhno-Sakhalinsk (Sakhalin Oblast) Yuzhno-Sakhalinsk (Russia)
- Location: 46.96071°N 142.74816°E; Resurrection Cathedral; Yuzhno-Sakhalinsk, Sakhalin Oblast, Russia
- Date: 9 February 2014; 12 years ago 14:00 (GMT+11)
- Attack type: Mass shooting
- Weapon: 12-gauge MP-133 pump-action shotgun
- Deaths: 2
- Injuries: 6
- Perpetrator: Stepan Aleksandrovich Komarov
- Defender: Vladimir Viktor Zaporozhets
- Motive: Anti-Christian sentiment

On 9 February 2014, a mass shooting occurred at the Resurrection Cathedral in Yuzhno-Sakhalinsk, Sakhalin Oblast, Russia. Security guard Stepan Komarov shot eight people, killing two, before being arrested. He was sentenced to life imprisonment in 2015.

Before the shooting, Komarov expressed anti-religious beliefs. He obtained the weapon used in the shooting from his employer, a private security company, sparking some controversy.

== Shooting ==
At 14:00 (GMT+11) on 9 February 2014, Stepan Komarov, carrying a shotgun, entered the cathedral, where a service commemorating the New Martyrs and Confessors of the Russian Orthodox Church had recently ended. A witness said that he was wearing a black security guard uniform. Congregants and clergy were still present, although most attendees of the service had left. According to eyewitnesses, Komarov approached the altar and yelled, "Everyone, get out of here!" After the congregants began running towards the exit, he opened fire.

A parishioner, Vladimir Viktor Zaporozhets, charged the shooter and attempted to stop him, but was shot four times in the head, chest, and legs, dying at the scene. Nun Lyudmila Pryashnikova, who was the first person to report the shooting, was also killed at the scene. Six other people were wounded. After shooting the victims, Komarov fired shots at icons inside the cathedral, and broke the cross at the entrance of the royal doors. He reportedly yelled about his hatred for Christianity and believers. Police officers arrived and arrested Komarov, who offered no resistance.

== Perpetrator ==
The shooter was identified as 24-year-old Stepan Aleksandrovich Komarov (Russian: Степан Александрович Комаров, born 1 December 1989), a bank security guard, former Russian Naval Infantry marine, and resident of Yuzhno-Sakhalinsk. He possessed a weapons license as part of his job. In the months preceding the shooting, Komarov posted diatribes on his VK profile about brainwashing and slavery, as well as photographs of weapons. According to the investigation, he was intoxicated during the shooting. A psychiatric test found no evidence of mental illness. Tattoos on his body included a swastika and a Nazi symbol. According to his parents, Komarov suffered a head injury in a maternity ward and had problems with mental health and self-control since childhood. Komarov followed modern paganism and was influenced by the teachings of Nikolai Levashov. Church officials and the investigation stated that the shooting was motivated by his distaste for the Orthodox faith, which was formed by his neo-pagan beliefs.

=== Legal proceedings ===
Komarov was charged with the murder of two or more persons, intentionally causing grievous bodily harm, intentional infliction of harm, hooliganism, vandalism, destruction or damage to objects of cultural heritage, and incitement to hatred. He faced a life sentence for these charges. Komarov testified during the trial, saying that he committed the shooting for "personal and strong convictions", but later recanted his statement and gave no motive. On 31 March 2015, Komarov was convicted of all charges. He was sentenced to 24 years imprisonment in a maximum security colony and forced to pay 7,500,000 ₽ to the dead and injured. On 12 April, prosecutors appealed to change the verdict, which the Supreme Court granted on 18 June, sentencing Komarov to life imprisonment. As of 2020, he was imprisoned in the "Snowflake" prison in Khabarovsk Krai. According to an employee, he refused to talk to anyone, including his parents.

== Reactions ==
Patriarch Kirill of Moscow, the head of Russian Orthodoxy, expressed his condolences for the shooting victims. Prayers were offered in the 2014 Winter Olympics village in Sochi. State Duma deputy Nikolay Kovalyov proposed to regulate the activities of private security companies like Komarov's employer.
