= Dmitry Golubev (serial killer) =

Uzbek-born serial killer

- Born: Dmitry Vladimirovich Golubev; December 8, 1972 (age 53); Tashkent, Uzbek SSR, Soviet Union
- Conviction: Murder
- Penalty: 12 years imprisonment (first conviction); Life imprisonment (second conviction)

Details
- Victims: 4
- Span of crimes: 1991–2008
- Country: Soviet Union, later Russia
- States: Tashkent, Penza
- Date apprehended: October 13, 2008
- Imprisoned at: Unknown special regime colony

Dmitry Vladimirovich Golubev (Russian: Дмитрий Владимирович Голубев; born December 8, 1972) is an Uzbekistani-born stateless serial killer. Initially convicted of a 1991 robbery-murder in Tashkent, he was released in 2003, moving to Russia, where five years later, he murdered a trio of fishermen during an argument in Penza Oblast. For this crime, he was sentenced to life imprisonment.

== Biography ==
Golubev was born in the Uzbekistani capital of Tashkent, the son of a Greek man and his Russian wife. Little information is known about his early life. In 1991, Golubev was given a 15-year sentence for a robbery-murder committed in Tashkent, but was released after 12 years. He then moved to Mokshan, where his mother was living, but failed to receive either Russian or Uzbekistani citizenship, and was unemployed.

=== Triple murder ===
On October 12, 2008, Golubev, together with a group of friends, went to drink vodka at a little pond near the village of Krutets, in the Kolyshleysky District. When they arrived, they saw a small group of fishermen on the other side of the pond: 66-year-old Azerbaijani Alexander Glukhov, locals Alexander Kocherov and Nazir Abdullaev (36 and 24, respectively), and another man, A. Pivkin. After both parties had drunk quite extensively, they started arguing and insulting each other, with one of the fishermen calling Golubev a homosexual. Pivkin then took out a knife and swung it at the other group, scaring Golubev away. Angered, Gobulev stormed off back to his company, started up the car and drove towards the fishermen.

Meanwhile, Pivkin had left the scene, while the others had gone to sleep. Golubev then drove through the tent of one of the men, landing his car into the water. Refusing to back down, he got a knife stashed in the car and attacked the trio, stabbing Abdullaev 19 times, killing him. He then focused his attention towards Kocherov, who was sleeping on the ground, and stabbed him 15 times. Ultimately, he also stabbed Glukhov (who had nothing to do with the quarrel) while he was sleeping in the car, inflicting a total of 23 stab wounds on him (9 in the abdomen, 9 in the head and the rest in other parts of the body). All of the fishermen died on the spot, from acute blood loss. After he had killed the men, Golubev fled the scene with his friends.

== Investigation, arrest and imprisonment ==
The crime scene was eventually discovered and authorities were notified. A timeline was constructed around the events, and the Investigative Department implemented a variety of measures through the region so they could catch the perpetrator. Eventually, policemen stopped a Lada 110 driven by E. Yuksina, a roommate of Golubev's. Through her, the whereabouts of A. Yuksin were established, who implicated Gobulev in the triple murder. After identifying their suspect, the authorities detained him at his home in Mokshan the following day.

Following some questioning, Gobulev confessed that he was responsible, but didn't give a testimony, as he claimed he was unable to remember the events. He had psychological and psychiatric examinations conducted on him by the Serbsky Center in Moscow, and experts concluded that he was well-aware of his actions, and was trying to derail the investigation. Since he has no citizenship, his case transgressed on Russian laws, and he was sentenced to life imprisonment. The court also ordered him to pay 300,000 rubles to cover the material costs for the victims' funerals.

== See also ==
- List of Russian serial killers
