= Corrective colony No. 2, Mordovia =

Russian women's prison

FKU Corrective Colony No. 2 of the FSIN of Russia for the Republic of Mordovia
- Interactive map of FKU Corrective Colony No. 2 of the FSIN of Russia for the Republic of Mordovia
- Location: Yavas, Mordovia, Russia; 54.419°N 42.857°E
- Status: Operational
- Security class: General regime colony
- Managed by: Federal Penitentiary Service
- Governor: Yelena Pozdnyakova

FKU (Note: 'FKU' stands for Federal Governmental Institution ("federalnoye kazyonnoye uchrezhdeniye") and UFSIN is for Office of the Federal Penitentiary Service ("Управление федеральной службы исполнения наказаний").) Corrective Colony No. 2 of the FSIN of Russia for the Republic of Mordovia, or simply IK-2 Yavas, is a women's corrective colony in Russia. It is located near Yavas, Mordovia, about 300 mi (480 km) southeast of Moscow. It is known for the incarceration of WNBA player Brittney Griner.

== Conditions ==
The prison was built as part of a system of similar prisons in the region in the 1930s during the Soviet era. University of Oxford scholar Judith Pallot described the prison as being "stuck in time for 50 years." Inmates are housed dormitory-style with 100 bunk beds in a large room. Personal belongings are not permitted. There is little supervision at night.

Prisoners wake at 6 a.m. with group exercises, then operate sewing machines for 10-12 hours per day, producing uniforms for military and prison service members.

According to University of Helsinki sociologist Olga Zeveleva, who works with the Gulag Echoes project studying Russian prison conditions, "Prisons in Mordovia are notoriously terrible, even by Russian standards. The prisons there are known for the harsh regimes and human rights violations." According to The Guardian, a popular saying among female prison inmates in Russia is "If you haven’t done time in Mordovia, you haven’t done time at all." Violence from other prisoners and prison guards is not as frequent as in men's prisons, but is not uncommon.

Prisoners at IK-2 Mordovia and human rights organizations have lodged complaints about conditions. Former inmate Olga Shilayeva, who was released in 2017, described frequent beatings by Vyacheslav Kimyaev, then a senior official. Kimyaev was later placed in charge of the facility. He was replaced by Yelena Pozdnyakova after a 2021 investigation by Russian authorities. Human rights organizations have little access for scrutinizing conditions.

== Notable inmates ==
WNBA player Brittney Griner was briefly incarcerated in the facility. In November 2022, she was transferred to IK-2 to serve a nine-year sentence for possession of medically prescribed vape cartridges containing less than 1 gram total of hashish oil. The Guardian wrote that according to Judith Pallot, who visited IK-2 in 2017 as part of her research on Russian prisons, Griner was sent to IK-2 because the place is hard to reach by journalists and other outsiders. On December 8, 2022, the U.S. swapped Griner for convicted Russian arms dealer Viktor Bout.

== See also ==
- Prisons in Russia
