= Vladimir Krishtopa =

Russian murderer and rapist

- Born: Vladimir Vasilievich Krishtopa; 6 April 1973 (age 53); Krasnivka, Ukrainian SSR, USSR
- Convictions: Murder, rape, theft
- Penalty: Death; commuted to 25 years imprisonment

Details
- Victims: 2+
- Span of crimes: June – August 1995
- Country: Russia
- State: Rostov
- Date apprehended: 3 August 1995

Vladimir Vasilievich Krishtopa (Russian: Влади́мир Васи́льевич Кришто́па; born 6 April 1973) is a Ukrainian-born Russian murderer and rapist.

== Crimes ==
=== First murder ===
On 17 June 1995, Krishtopa, in a state of intoxication, attacked a woman on the staircase between the 6th and 7th floors of the No. 70 House on Orbitalnaya Street in Rostov-on-Don. The woman was raped by him, and then severely beaten. As a result of the beating, she died from a closed craniocerebral injury.

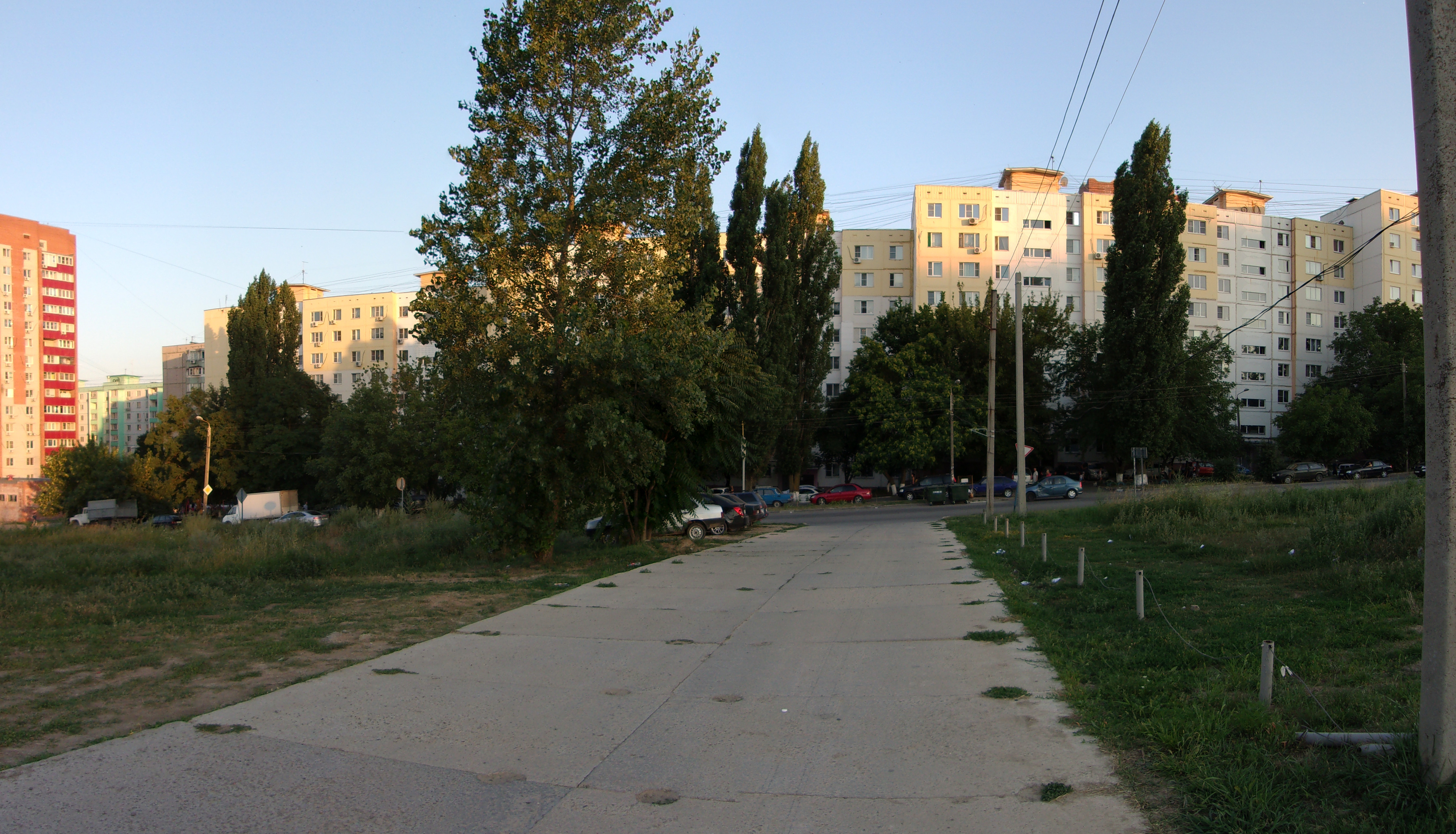
Orbitalnaya St., 70, the site of the first murder.

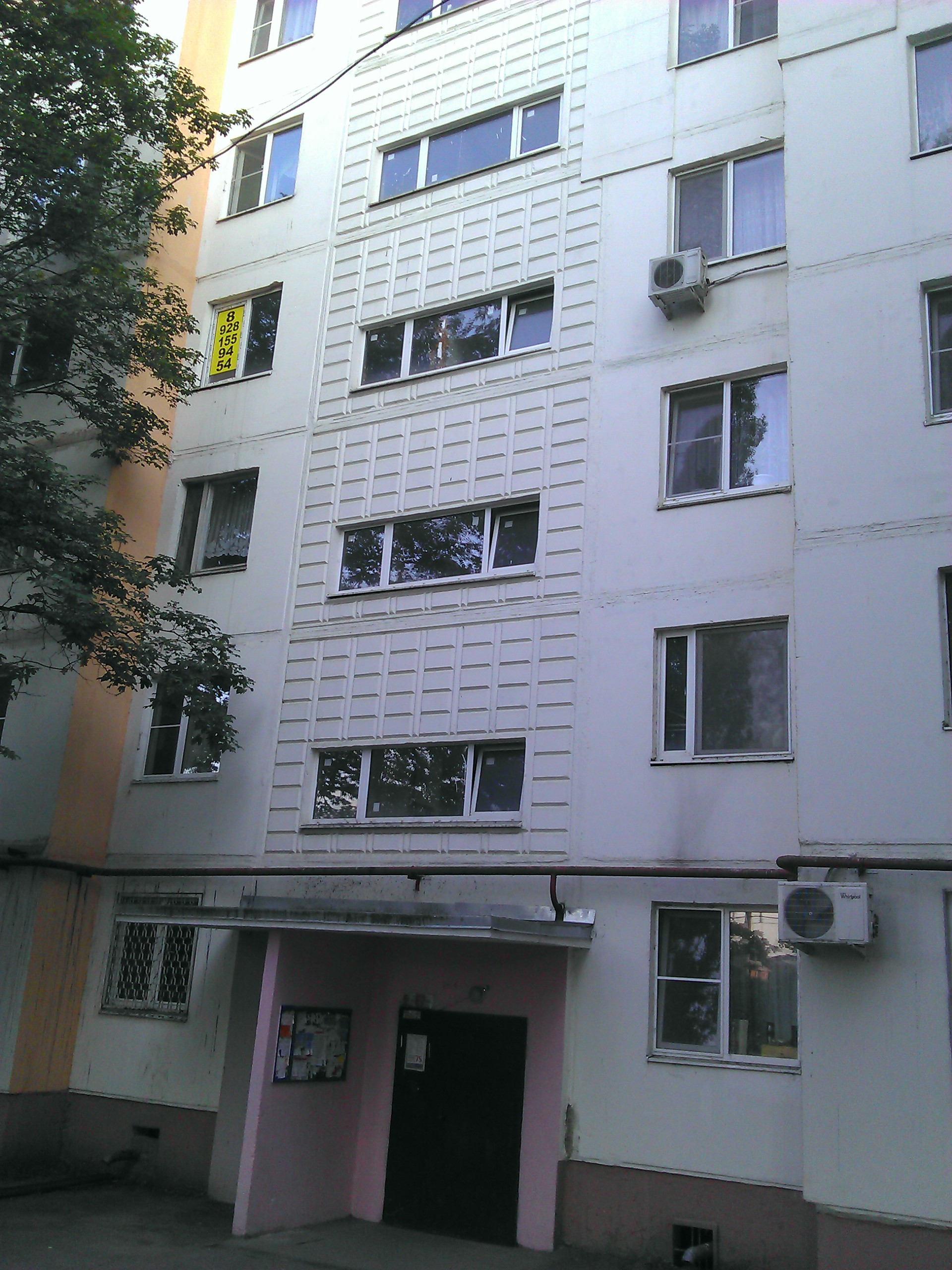
The stairwell where the first murder was committed.

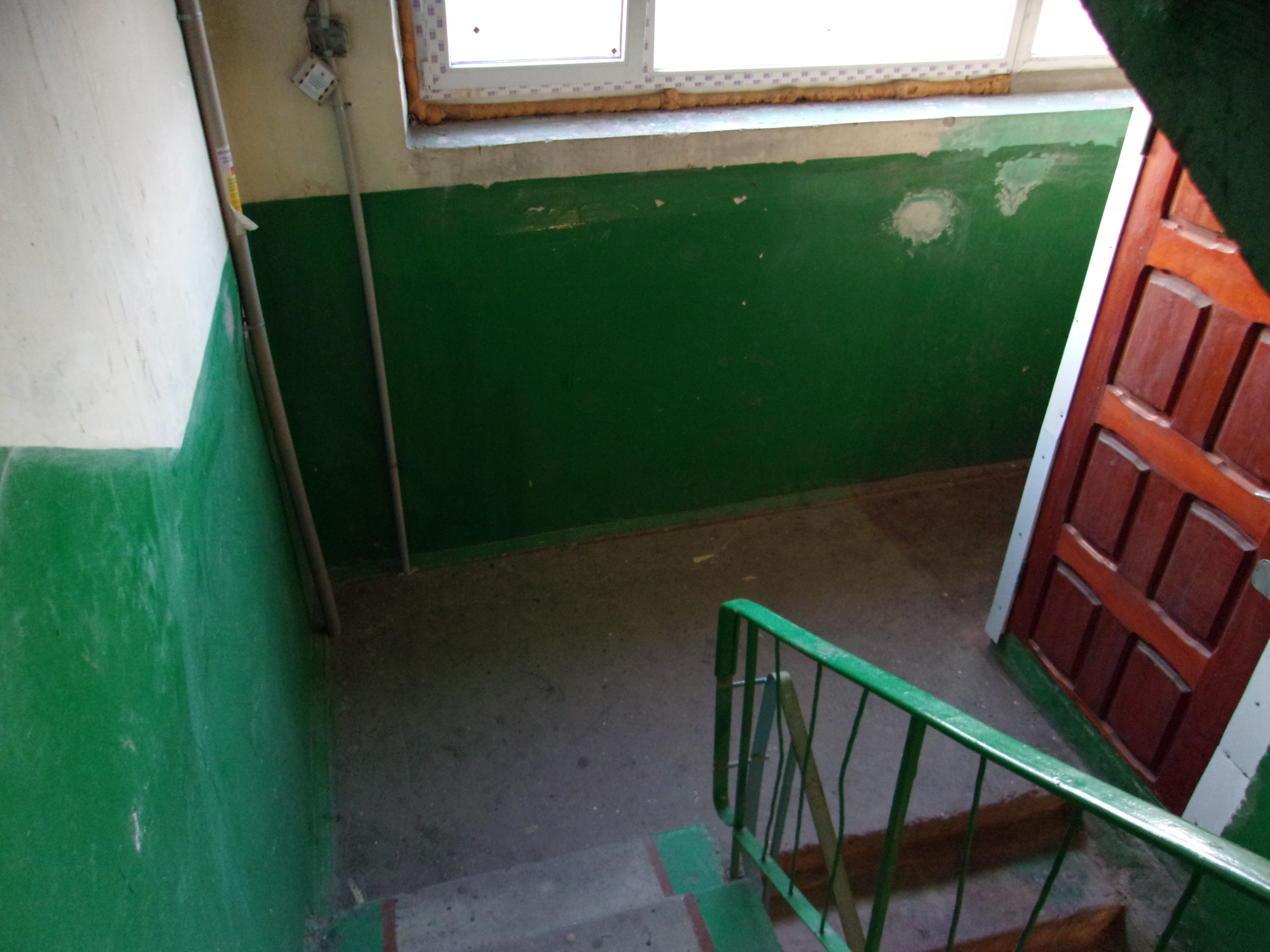
The staircase where the first murder was committed.

=== Second murder ===
A month later, on 21 July, Krishtopa, again intoxicated, committed another murder, raping the woman before strangling her. He then stole her cassette player without the headphones.

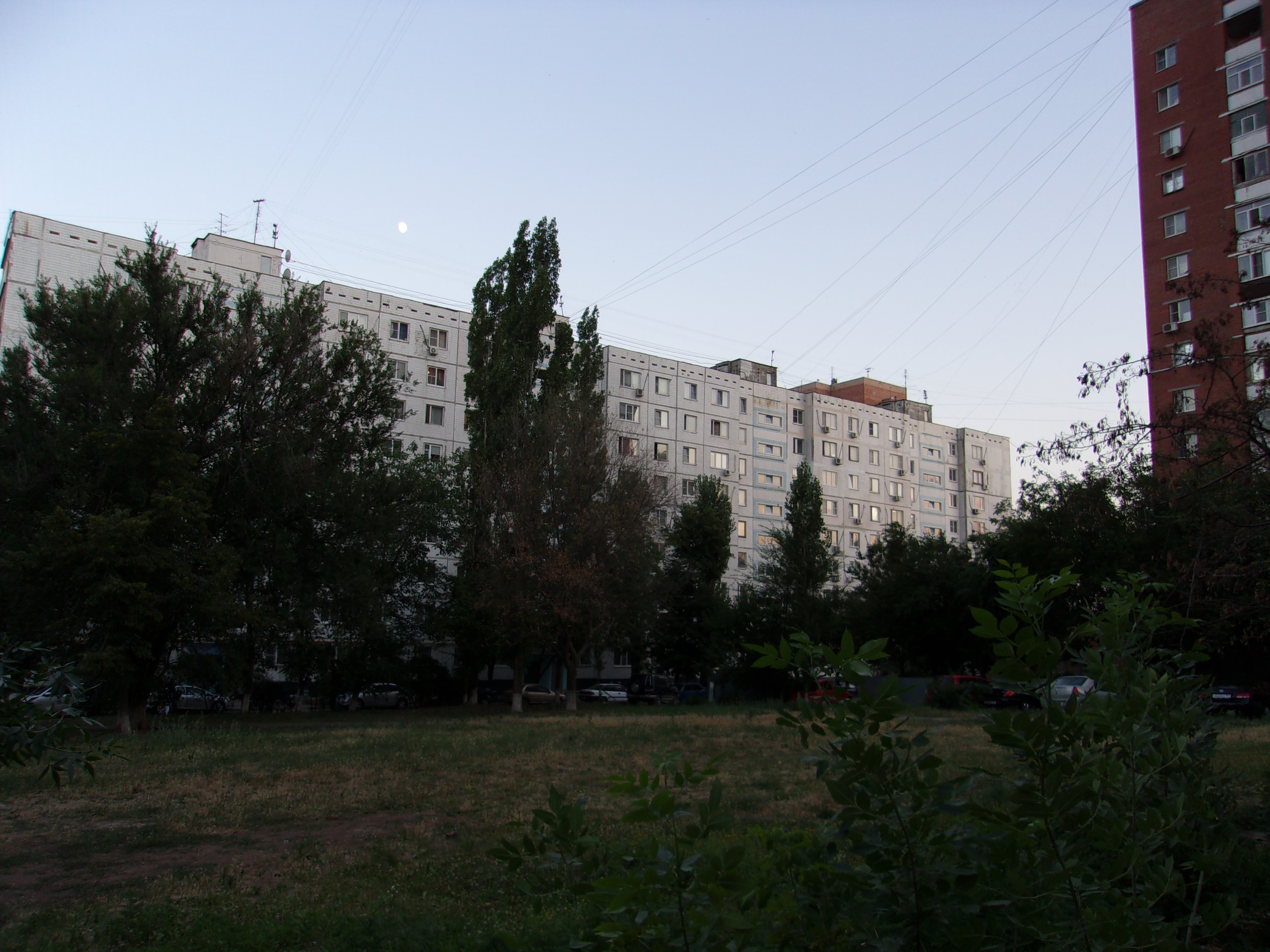
Kosmonavtov St., 18, the site of the second murder. It was committed in the rightmost stairwell.

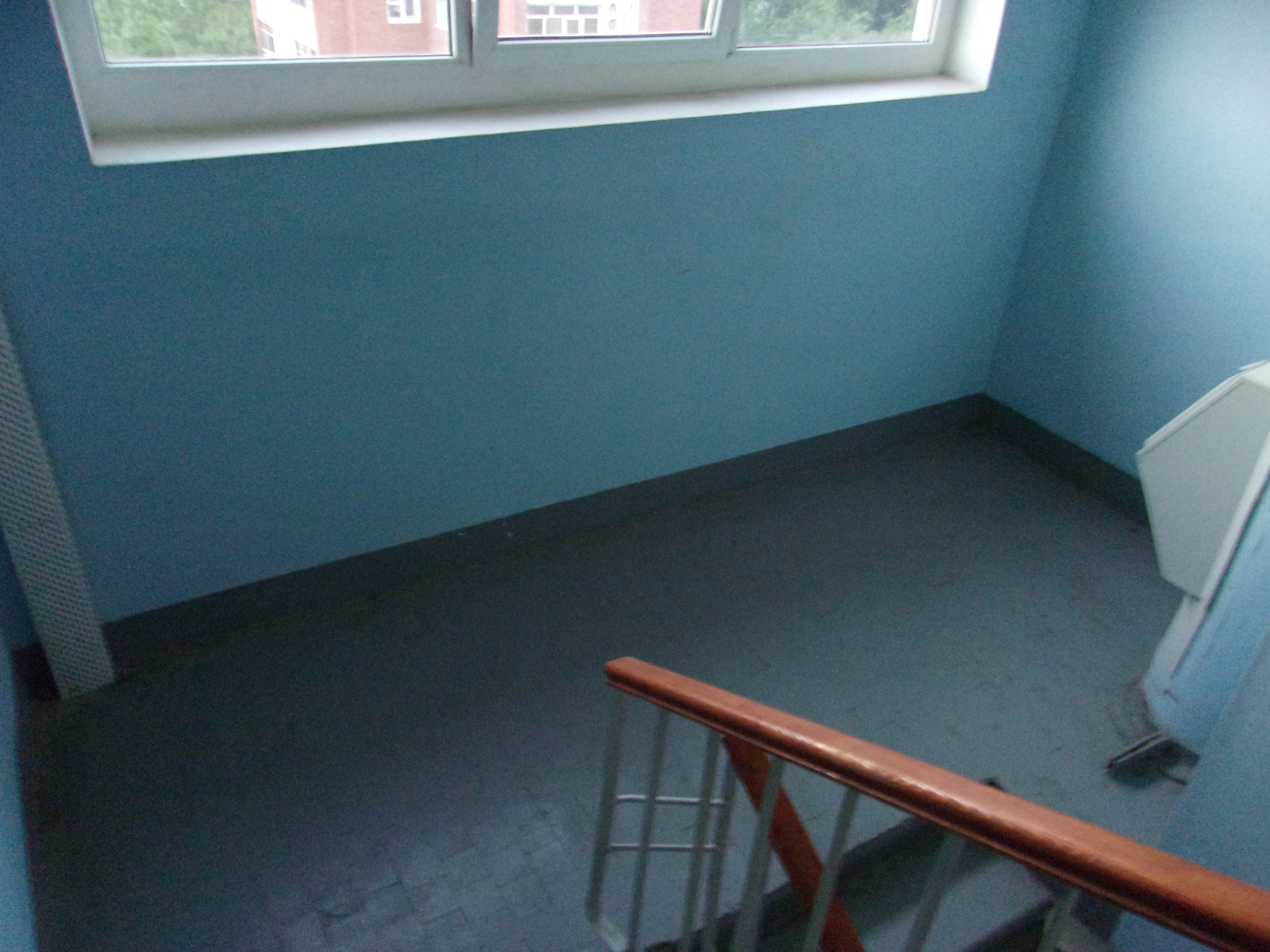
The staircase where the second murder was committed.

=== Third murder attempt ===
Krishtopa did not commit any more crimes until 3 August, when he was detained for attempting to kill a third woman. During the search, authorities found the audio player, which served as crucial evidence.

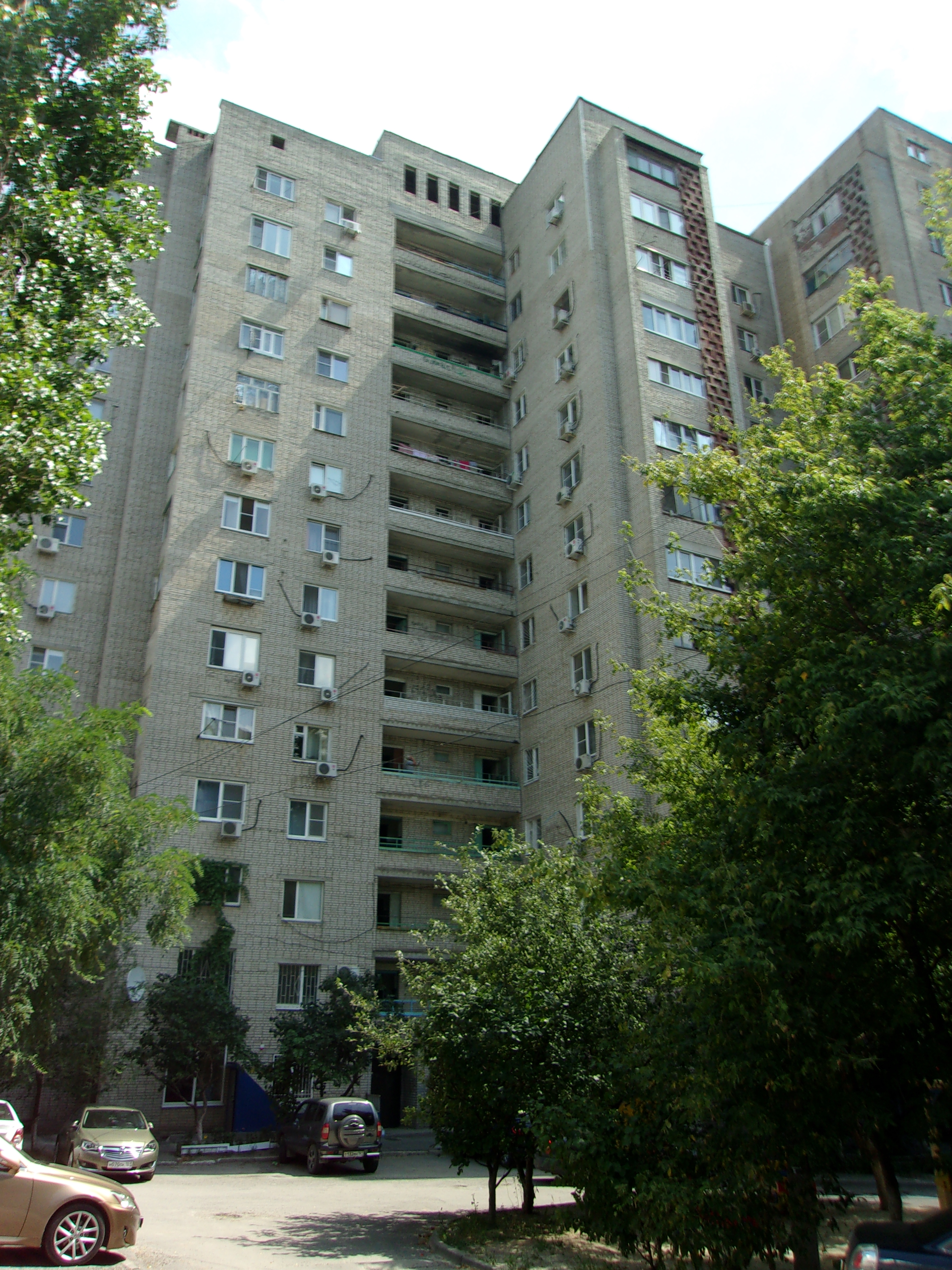
Kosmonavtov St., 21, the site of the third and last murder attempt.

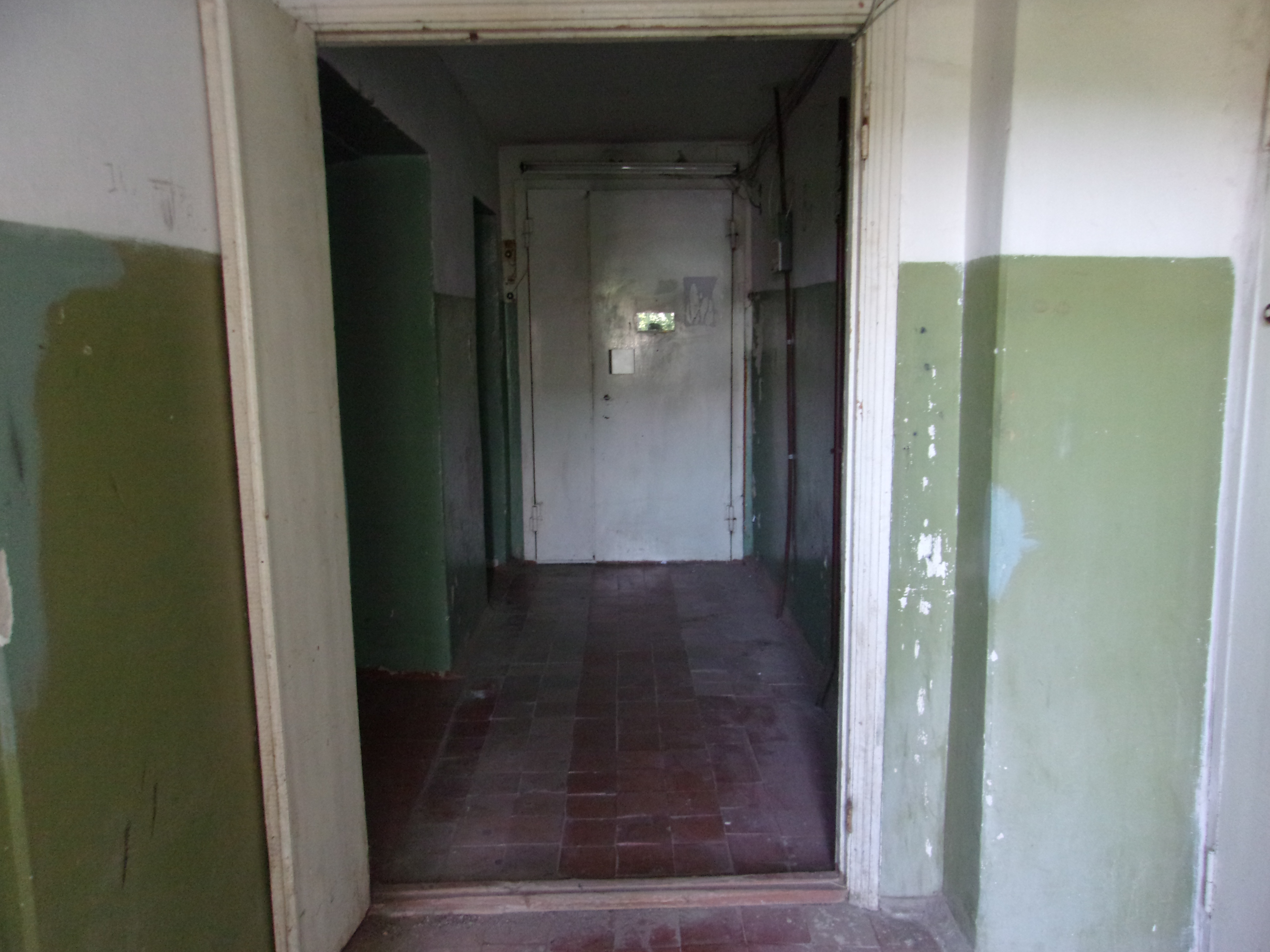
Elevator exit at 7th floor, the site where Krishtopa attacked his first victim, beating her unconscious.

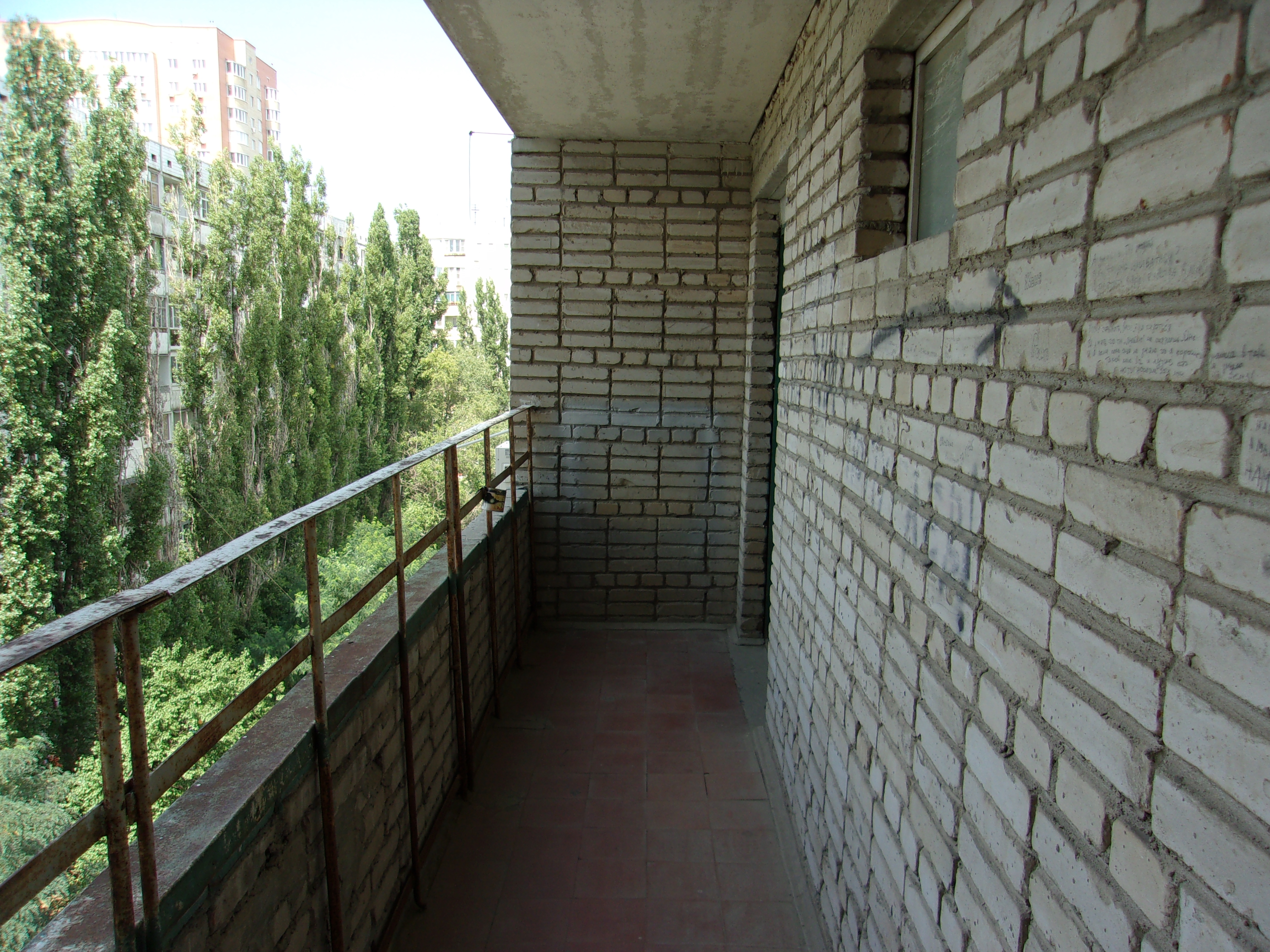
7th-floor balcony where Krishtopa dragged his unconscious victim.

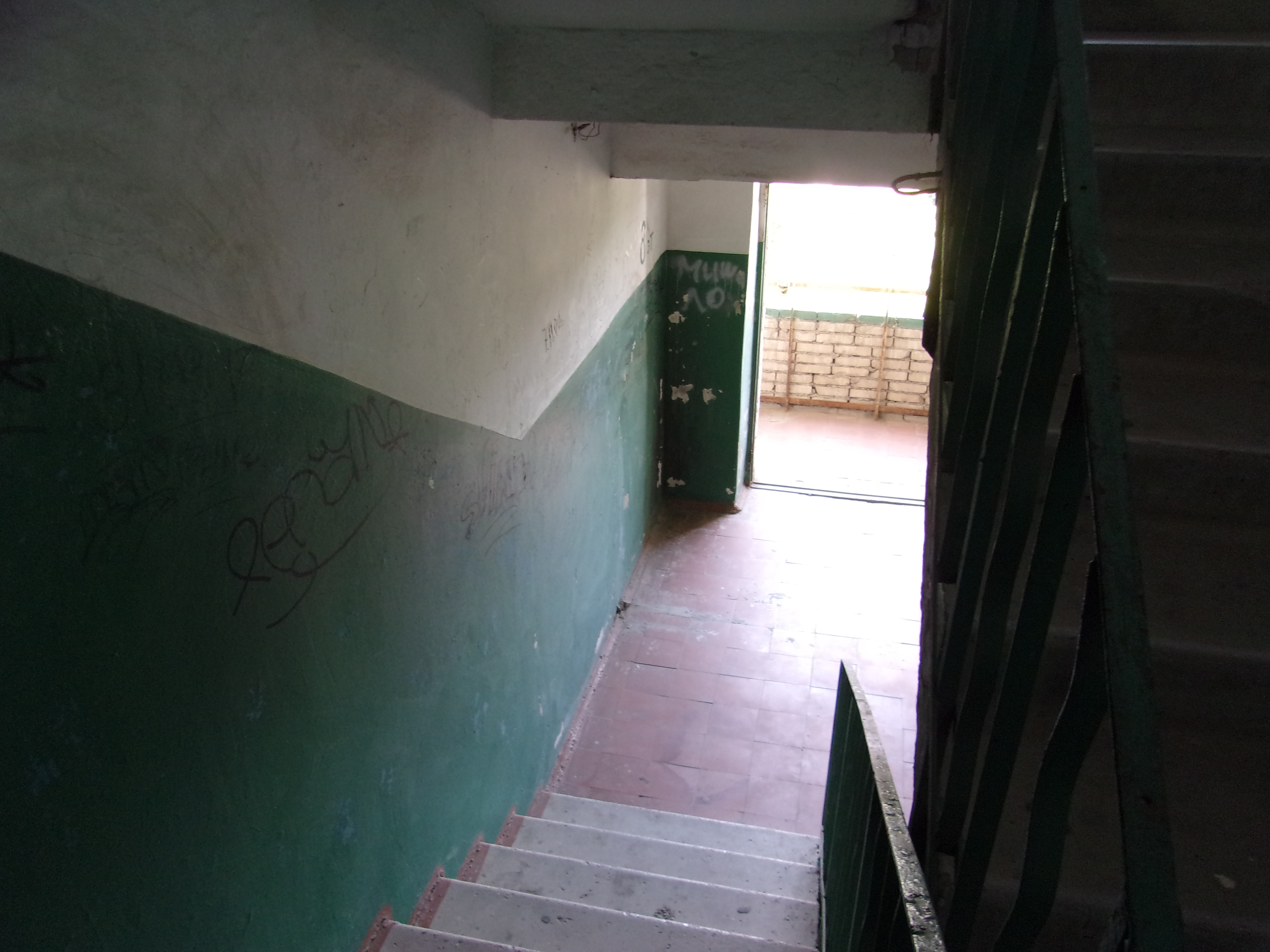
The 7-th floor staircase, the site where Krishtopa attempted the rape and the murder of his last victim.

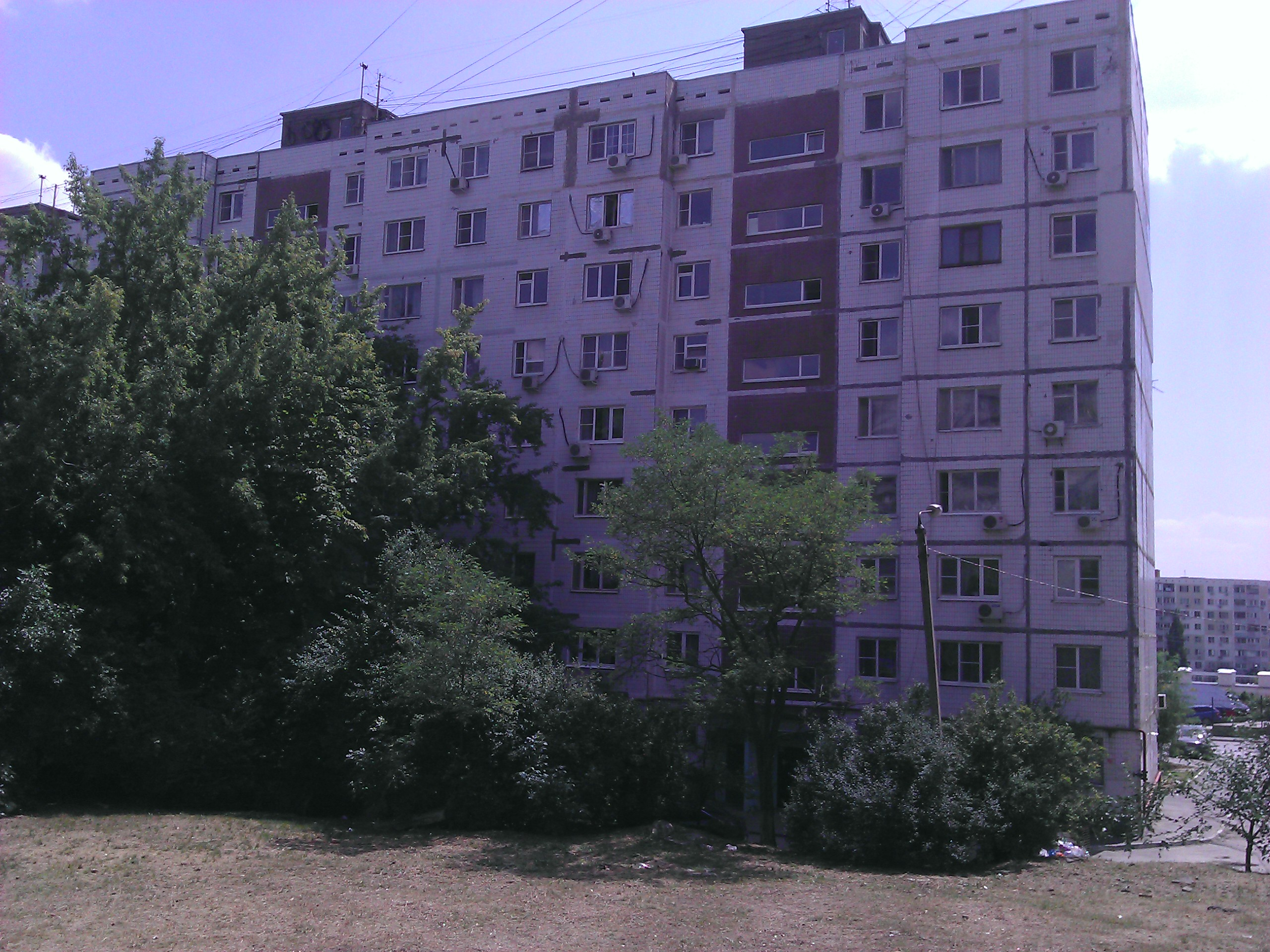
Komarova St., 34. The house where Krishopa was arrested.

On 21 March 1996, the Rostov Regional Court judge Mikhail Rebrov sentenced Vladimir Krishtopa to execution by firing squad. But soon, a moratorium was imposed on its application, and the criminal who was already on death row in Novocherkassk was resentenced to 25 years in prison. When Krishtopa was in cell number 117 of the Novocherkassk prison, his neighbour was notorious serial killer Vladimir Mukhankin. Subsequently, while giving an interview for the television programme "Criminal Russia", Mukhankin said the following:

There, in the 117th [cell], stayed Krishtopa. He was here, on a death row, too, by the way, here, incidentally, here is the 45th cell, maybe he is still sitting there. Well, the complete scoundrel, but this, Amurkhan Khadrisovich, but this is a natural maniac. Because if a man weren't a maniac, he would not have gnawed his noses over there, nor would he sucked out there from the breasts over there, nor from the vagina, nor would he kill the little children, nor would not rape them over there, nor adults, nor especially grannies.

Krishtopa is also suspected of committing crimes in his native Ukraine before moving to Rostov.

== In the media ==
- A look from the inside. Russian Psychiatrist (1996).
- The 2005 episode of the Russian documentary TV series "Profession Reporter", titled "Birth of a Maniac", features an interview with Krishtopa.

== See also ==
- List of Russian serial killers
