= Wallens Ridge State Prison =

Level 5 state prison located in Big Stone Gap, Virginia, US

- Location in Virginia
- Location: Big Stone Gap, Virginia; 36°50′31.4″N 82°47′12.5″W
- Status: Operational
- Security class: Supermax
- Population: 1200
- Opened: April 1999
- Managed by: Virginia Department of Corrections
- Director: Joseph Walters
- Warden: Rodney Younce (acting warden)
- Website: vadoc.virginia.gov/facilities/western/wallens-ridge/

Wallens Ridge State Prison is a level 5 state men's prison located in Big Stone Gap, Virginia, housing approximately 1,200 inmates. Since opening in April 1999, it has been a part of the Virginia Department of Corrections, and is identical to the Red Onion State Prison near Pound. The prison was built for over $70 million. As of 1999 the prison employs almost 800 people.

== Notable inmates ==
- Bobby Joe Leonard
- Richard Samuel McCroskey
