= Dmitry Dilschneider =

Russian serial killer

- Born: Dmitry Aleksandrovich Dilschneider; 1981 (age 44–45); Novosibirsk, RSFSR, SSSR
- Other name: "The Novosibirsk Raskolnikov"
- Years active: 2007
- Conviction: Murder x5
- Penalty: Life imprisonment

Details
- Victims: 5
- Country: Russia
- State: Novosibirsk
- Date apprehended: December 2007
- Imprisoned at: Snowflake

Dmitry Aleksandrovich Dilschneider (Russian: Дмитрий Александрович Дильшнайдер; born 1981), known as The Novosibirsk Raskolnikov (Russian: Новосибирский Раскольников), is a Russian serial killer and robber who murdered five people in the city of Novosibirsk, Novosibirsk Oblast, from November to December 2007. He was sentenced to life imprisonment.

== Early life ==
Dmitry Dilschneider was born in Novosibirsk in 1981. He grew up in a socially disadvantaged environment. In his teenage years, he attended boxing classes, but did not achieve success in the sports field, as a result of which, after graduating from school, he began to lead a criminal lifestyle. In 1998, he was twice convicted of theft, fraud and extortion, but in both cases received a suspended sentence. In 2000, he was convicted again and sentenced to seven years and eight months in prison for theft and robbery. He served his entire sentence and was released in March 2007. Once free, Dilschneider began taking drugs. Experiencing problems with his financial situation and employment and suffering from drug addiction, Dilschneider decided to make money through crime.

== Crimes ==
In November and December 2007, Dilschneider committed 13 robberies, five of which ended in murder. As victims, he chose people who had reached retirement age, who were subject to great victimization and, due to their state of health, were not able to provide active resistance. He committed crimes according to the same pattern with an interval of one or several days. In the evening, Dilschneider looked for elderly women and men on the street or near shops and savings banks and began to chase them, after which he attacked the victims in the entrances of apartment buildings, hitting them with a hammer and taking away valuables. Subsequently, the loot from such robberies was not enough for him, and he began to enter their apartments with pensioners, attacking after they opened the door with their key. He stole money, jewelry, mobile phones and household appliances from homes. He sold the loot and used the money to buy drugs. In some episodes, in addition to a hammer, he used a screwdriver as a weapon. Surviving assault victims who suffered head injuries often did not remember anything.

== Arrest, investigation and trial ==
The series of crimes caused a public outcry, and an investigative and operational group was formed to investigate it, whose members organized daily patrols in the "favourite" places of the criminal. In early December 2007, Dilschneider was detained. He attracted the attention of the operatives with his suspicious behavior: the man watched the old men passing by, looked around and carried a black bag in his hands. During the inspection of his personal belongings, a hammer, pliers and gloves were found, as well as a map of the city, divided into squares, on which marks were made that coincided with the addresses of the murdered pensioners. At first, Dilschneider denied it, stating that he used the tools found on him to perform electrical work at home, and the marks on the map are the addresses of his clients, but he soon admitted to his crime and wrote a confession on 11 counts of crimes. A forensic psychiatric examination found him sane. In November 2008, the criminal case was brought to court. On May 21, 2009, the Novosibirsk Regional Court found Dmitry Dilschneider guilty of all charges and sentenced him to life imprisonment in a special regime colony. Dilschneider filed a cassation appeal with a request to commute the sentence, but soon the Supreme Court of the Russian Federation rejected it and upheld the sentence.

== Imprisonment ==
After his conviction, Dilschneider was transferred to correctional colony No. 56 of the Department of the Federal Penitentiary Service for the Sverdlovsk Region, better known as the "Black Golden Eagle". In 2017, he was transferred to correctional colony No. 6 of the Department of the Federal Penitentiary Service for the Khabarovsk Territory, better known as "Snezhinka". In conclusion, Dilschneider became interested in studying the criminal procedure code and articles on the constitutional rights of citizens, and over the years he repeatedly filed lawsuits, complaints and petitions with various authorities. In particular, he filed appeals with the Kirovsky District Court of Novosibirsk for violation of the conditions of detention in Snezhinka, demanding moral compensation for cold food, walks in the dark, a parcel not issued on time, etc., and won them several times. According to the prison description, Dilschneider is prone to escape and attack; during his detention in the Black Golden Eagle, he repeatedly violated the regime and was subject to disciplinary sanctions, ending up in a punishment cell.

== See also ==
- List of Russian serial killers
