= Nikolai Chigirinsky =

Russian serial killer

- Born: Nikolai Vasilievich Chigirinsky; 17 July 1983 (age 43); Pervouralsk, RSFSR
- Other names: "The Pervouralsk Ripper" "The Pervouralsk Maniac" "The Pervouralsk Strangler" "The Urals Pedophile"
- Conviction: Murder
- Penalty: Life imprisonment

Details
- Victims: 3
- Span of crimes: 2005–2009
- Country: Russia
- State: Sverdlovsk
- Date apprehended: 28 May 2009
- Imprisoned at: Snowflake prison (Khabarovsk Krai)

Nikolai Vasilievich Chigirinsky (Russian: Никола́й Васи́льевич Чигири́нских; born 17 July 1983), known as The Pervouralsk Ripper (Russian: Первоуральский потрошитель), is a Russian serial killer.

== Biography ==
Chigirinsky was born on 17 July 1983, in the city of Pervouralsk in the family of a plant security guard and a butcher. While still in school, he began to steal, and was detained while attempting to steal from the city's food store, for which he was registered in the Inspectorate for Juvenile Affairs of the Internal Affairs Directorate. By that time Chigirinsky had already been registered with a psychiatrist, and according to some reports, he had a birth trauma associated with the nervous system. He graduated from the 9th grade of school, with a specialty of a mechanic in the area of repairing metallurgical equipment. For 1.5 years he worked in the Pervouralsk New Pipe Plant but was forced to move to another place because of staff reduction. He also had to move back in with his parents because of his low salary.

The first murder Chigirinsky committed was on 3 July 2005. That day, leading a girl named Anya into the forest, he first strangled and then raped her. He then burned her clothes, and buried the corpse, despite the fact that the murder occurred a few meters away from a pedestrian walkway through which the holiday residents constantly went through. The very next day an application for the girl's disappearance was filed by relatives to the law enforcement agencies. The murder remained unsolved. In 2006, Chigirinsky returned to the crime scene, dug up the corpse and tore off the head. The body was found only after the killer was arrested.

On 19 September 2008, Chigirinsky committed another murder. The corpse was found 15 metres from the railroad tracks of Yekaterinburg-Shalya road and 50 metres from Stepan Razin Street. The victim had been raped and strangled, with her belly ripped open with a knife and her clothes burned.

On 28 May 2009, Chigirinsky committed the last murder. The same day the corpse was found in the basement by the deceased's parents, who saw Chigirinsky leaving the cellar. He was quickly arrested, and the last victim's mobile phone was found in his possession.

The court sentenced Chigirinsky to life imprisonment, and the Supreme Court of Russia upheld the verdict without change. He is currently serving his sentence in the Snowflake prison.

== See also ==
- List of Russian serial killers
