= Lgov Prison =

Prison in Lgov, Russia

- Interactive map of Lgov Prison
- Location: Lgov, Kursk Oblast, Russia
- Status: operational
- Security class: detention center
- Managed by: Ministry of Justice of the RF

Lgov Prison (Russian: Льго́вская коло́ния), officially Correctional Colony No. 3 (Федеральное бюджетное учреждение "Исправительная колония №3" УФСИН России по Курской области or ФКУ ИК-3), is a prison in Lgov, Kursk Oblast, in southwestern Russia. Lgov is located south of Moscow. It is operated by the Federal Penitentiary Service.

In June 2005 hundreds of prisoners, en masse, slashed themselves with razors to protest violations of their rights. The prisoners cut their legs, necks, and wrists. Afterwards, 179 prisoners sought medical attention for the self-inflicted injuries.
