= Elban =

Urban locality in Khabarovsk Krai, Russia

Coordinates: 50°05′30″N 136°30′24″E

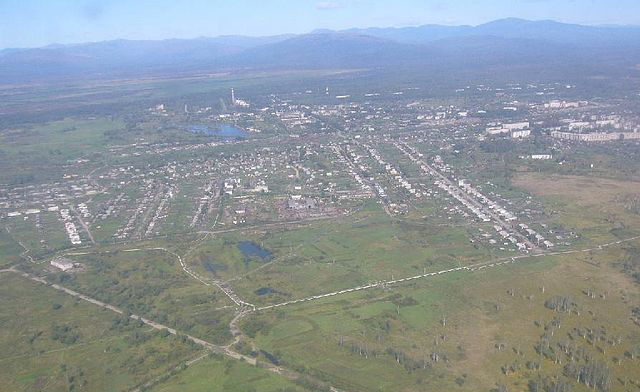

Elban (Russian: Эльбан) is an urban-type settlement in Amursky District, Khabarovsk Krai, Russia. Population: 11,934 (2010 census); 12,909 (2002 census); 15,213 (1989 Soviet census).
