= Dolgopolov =

Dolgopolov (masculine, Russian: Долгополов) or Dolgopolova (feminine, Russian: Долгополова) is a Russian surname. Notable people with the surname include:

- Alexandr Dolgopolov (born 1988), Ukrainian tennis player, son of Oleksandr
- Astafy Dolgopolov (1725 – after 1797), Russian confidence trickster and impostor
- Oleksandr Dolgopolov Sr. (born 1964), Soviet–Ukrainian tennis player, father of Alexandr
- Vladimir Dolgopolov (1961–2016), Russian soccer player and convicted murderer
- Sergey Dolgopolov (born 1941), Russian–Latvian politician
