= Anatoly Sedykh (serial killer) =

Russian serial killer (1963–2023)

- Born: Anatoly Petrovich Sedykh; 20 April 1963; Lipetsk, Russian SFSR, USSR
- Died: 11 June 2023 (aged 60); Mordovian Zone, Zubovo-Polyansky District, Mordovia, Russia
- Cause of death: Suicide
- Conviction: Murder
- Penalty: Life imprisonment

Details
- Victims: 12
- Span of crimes: 1998–2003
- Country: Russia
- State: Lipetsk
- Date apprehended: 4 June 2008
- Imprisoned at: Mordovian Zone, Sosnovka, Mordovia

Anatoly Petrovich Sedykh (Russian: Анато́лий Петро́вич Седы́х; 20 April 1963 – 11 June 2023) was a Russian serial killer.

== Biography ==
Sedykh was born in 1963.

Sedykh began to commit crimes in early 1998. His victims were women under the age of 28, whom he raped and murdered, stealing their valuables afterwards.

The case of the Lipetsk killer acquired great public resonance, and for his capture, a reward of 100 thousand rubles and a car were promised. Sedykh was repeatedly detained by police officers, but due to a lack of evidence against him, he was released.

The last murder Sedykh committed was in 2003. He did not kill anybody after that but continued to keep the victims' belongings in his garage. In 2008, a relative accidentally found a mobile phone from one of the victims and turned it on, which made it possible to trace his whereabouts. On 4 June 2008, Sedykh was detained, and the above-mentioned material evidence was found in the garage. In addition, there was a VAZ-2106, a car that had been seen by some of the witnesses. After two genetic examinations, Sedykh confessed to all the crimes.

On 19 April 2010, the Lipetsk Regional Court sentenced Sedykh to life imprisonment. The punishment was to be served in the "Black Berkut" colony in the Sverdlovsk Oblast. In September 2013, the media reported that the convict had committed suicide by hanging himself in a colony cell, but the regional UFSIN disproved this information the following day.

Sedykh committed suicide on 11 June 2023, at the age of 60.

== See also ==
- Viktor Sotnikov
- Nikolay Shubin
- List of Russian serial killers
- List of serial killers by number of victims
