= Mordovian Zone =

Federal prison in Russia

- Interactive map of Mordovian Zone
- Location: Sosnovka, Mordovia, Russia; 54.2675°N 42.8864°E
- Status: Operational
- Capacity: 1005
- Population: 160
- Opened: 1931
- Managed by: Federal Penitentiary Service
- Governor: Aleksandr Shavkun

Federal Governmental Institution — correctional colony No. 1 of the Federal Penitentiary Service of Russia in the Republic of Mordovia, also known as the Mordovian Zone (Russian: Мордовская зона, Mordovskaya zona) is a Russian prison located in the settlement of Sosnovka in Mordovia. It is one of the seven maximum-security supermax prisons operated by the Federal Penitentiary Service for convicts sentenced to life imprisonment in Russia. Both life prisoners and prisoners sentenced to 25 years of imprisonment serve their sentences in the Mordovian Zone.

== Notable inmates ==
- Sergei Ryakhovsky, serial killer
- Igor Irtyshov, serial killer and child rapist
- Anatoly Sedykh, serial killer
- Pavel Shuvalov, serial killer
- Shavkat Shayakhmedov, serial killer and child rapist
- Oleg Kuznetsov, serial killer and rapist
- Dmitry Balakin, serial killer
- Igor Ptitsyn, serial killer and rapist
