= Gennady Kornienko =

- Геннадий Корниенко

Head of the Federal Penitentiary Service
- In office 12 June 2012 – 1 October 2019
- President: Vladimir Putin
- Prime Minister: Mikhail Mishustin
- Preceded by: Aleksandr Reymer
- Succeeded by: Aleksandr Kalashnikov

Director of the State Courier Service
- In office 12 April 2002 – 26 June 2012
- Preceded by: Andrei Chernenko
- Succeeded by: Valery Tikhonov

Personal details
- Born: 27 January 1964 (age 62) Lakhdenpokhya, Karelo-Finnish ASSR, Soviet Union
- Party: Independent
- Education: Leningrad Polytechnic Institute

Military service
- Allegiance: Russia
- Branch/service: Police of Russia
- Years of service: 1981-2019
- Rank: Lieutenant general

Gennady Alexandrovich Kornienko (Russian: Геннадий Александрович Корниенко; born September 30, 1954, in the settlement of Lakhdenpokhya, Karelo-Finnish ASSR) is a Russian government official, a Colonel General (2001), a Colonel General of the Internal Service, and a Candidate of Legal Sciences (2004). From 2012 to 2019, he served as the Director of the Federal Penitentiary Service. From 2002 to 2012, he served as the Director of the State Courier Service. He is a member of the Board of Trustees of the HC Dynamo Moscow.

== Biography ==
He holds a higher education degree from the Electromechanical Faculty of the Leningrad Polytechnic Institute as well as specialized higher education.

Beginning in 1981, he served in the KGB and subsequently in the FSB.

In 2001, he was appointed Deputy Director of the Federal Protective Service, a position he held until 2002. In 2002, he was appointed Director of the State Courier Service.

On June 26, 2012, by decree of the President of Russia, he was appointed Director of the Federal Penitentiary Service, succeeding Aleksandr Reymer in this role.

On September 30, 2019, pursuant to Decree of the President of the Russian Federation No. 474, he was relieved of his duties as Director of the Federal Penitentiary Service upon reaching the maximum age for service.

== Awards ==
- Order of Alexander Nevsky (2015);
- Order "For Military Merit" (2004)
- Medal of the Order "For Merit to the Fatherland", 1st class (2006)
- Medal of the Order "For Merit to the Fatherland", 2nd class
- Medal "In Commemoration of the 850th Anniversary of Moscow"
- Jubilee Medal "70 Years of the Armed Forces of the USSR"
- Medal "For Strengthening of Combat Cooperation" (Ministry of Defence of Russia)
- Medal "200 Years of the Ministry of Defence"
- Medal "200 Years of the Ministry of Internal Affairs of Russia"
- Medal "For Fidelity to Duty" (State Courier Service)
- Medal "For Service" (State Courier Service), 1st class
- Medal "150 Years of the Founding of the Bailiff Service" (September 14, 2015, Order of the Federal Bailiff Service of Russia No. 1875-k)
- Medals "For Impeccable Service," 1st, 2nd, and 3rd classes
- Certificate of Honor of the Government of the Russian Federation (2004)
- Certificate of Honor of the Commonwealth of Independent States (October 10, 2008) — for active work in strengthening and developing the Commonwealth of Independent States.
