= Viktor Sotnikov =

Viktor Sotnikov may refer to:

- Viktor Sotnikov (athlete)
- Viktor Sotnikov (serial killer)
