= 1992 Tatarstan shooting =

Mass murder incident in Russia

Andrei Shpagonov
- Shpagonov in court
- Born: 13 September 1969; Kazan, Tatarstan, Soviet Union
- Died: 11 November 1995 (aged 26); Kazan, Tatarstan, Russia
- Status: Executed by shooting
- Motive: Robbery; Eliminating witnesses
- Convictions: Murder with aggravating circumstances (9 counts); Robbery
- Penalty: Death

Details
- Date: 26 April 1992; 34 years ago
- Country: Russia
- Location: Tatarstan
- Target: State Courier Service personnel
- Killed: 9
- Injured: 1
- Weapons: Makarov pistol Knife

The 1992 Tatarstan shooting was a mass murder which occurred in Tatarstan, Russia, on 26 April 1992. The perpetrator, Andrei Shpagonov, shot and killed 9 people and seriously injured another during a robbery attempting to steal firearms from his former workplace with the State Courier Service. Shpagonov and his accomplice, Dmitri Kovalev, were arrested and sentenced to death and 15 years imprisonment, respectively. On 11 November 1995, Shpagonov was executed by shooting.

== Background ==
=== Perpetrator ===
Andrei Shpagonov (Russian: Андрей Шпагонов) was born on 13 September 1969, in Kazan, Tatarstan, Soviet Union. He was released from compulsory military service in the Soviet Army due to illness, instead attending a vocational school from which he graduated. Shpagonov worked at a factory before joining the Tatarstan branch of the State Courier Service. At work, he established himself as a loner, where he was known to be withdrawn and uncommunicative. Despite this, Shpagonov was a talented marksman, and regularly received promotions in the service. According to his former colleagues, Shpagonov became involved in petty theft. At the beginning of 1991, Shpagonov was dismissed from the State Courier Service for non-compliance in his position, and after the dismissal worked as a security guard in a private furniture store in Kazan, but was soon dismissed for unknown reasons. Shpagonov also tried to organize his own trading business but failed.

=== Preparation ===
In December 1991, due to his dismissals and failed business ventures, Shpagonov formulated a plan to steal weapons that had been held at his former workplace with the State Courier Service, enlisting the help of his cousin, Dmitri Kovalev, as a driver. Despite refusing at first because he feared the death penalty in the event they were caught, Kovalev later accepted as he was heavily in debt and Shpagonov promised to make sure there were no witnesses. Shpagonov then spent four months preparing for the robbery.

== Shooting ==
At 10 p.m. Shpagonov on 26 April 1992, went to his former workplace at the State Courier Service in Kazan, armed with a knife and a Makarov pistol. After sneaking into the second floor of the building through a door that had not closed properly, he shot one man (named Lepuhin Лепухин) and stabbed him numerous times. Shpagonov went into another room where he shot and stabbed sleeping Shmelev (Шмелев), then moved to the first floor and killed Komardin, who was also sleeping, before looting the men's government-issued firearms. All three of the men had been drinking vodka and were former colleagues of Shpagonov. When another employee Nogaytsev rang the doorbell requesting entry to the building, Shpagonov let him in and then shot him in the back of the head. After that he went to an administrative office and shot at four women, killing three and wounding one, Lyalya Forseyeva (Ляля Форсеева). One of the women managed to exit the building trying to flee, but Shpagonov caught and killed her. Forseyeva, who was badly injured but survived, moved to a room where she locked herself inside, called the police, and wrote Shpagonov's name on the floor using her blood in case he killed her. Shpagonov heard Forseyeva's footsteps and searched the building, but after finding nothing he returned to the administrative office where he discovered one of the women he shot was still alive. Assuming the footsteps had been the woman's, he shot her in the head before packing 67 firearms and more than 700 rounds of ammunition that were in the building. As Shpagonov was about to leave the doorbell rang when another employee, Sadriev (Садыев), and his driver had recently arrived from Moscow. The two entered the building to discover a dead body in the lobby, where Shpagonov shot and killed them before dousing the building with gasoline and setting it on fire.

Dmitri Kovalev, who was waiting for Shpagonov outside, saw the building on fire, and assuming something had gone wrong with the robbery he drove off. Shpagonov walked around the building and ran into a few people, but managed to distract them by shouting that there were people inside the burning building. The killer attempted to leave in a car belonging to the State Courier Service with the guns and ammunition he had stolen, but after the car would not start he abandoned both. Shpagnov then fled on foot, dumping his Makarov pistol into a nearby river.

== Investigation ==
The building fire was eventually extinguished, where the bodies of 9 dead people and Lyalya Forseyeva (who was unconscious) were found, and the stolen weapons and ammunition were found in the State Courier Service car. Forseyeva's inscription written in blood was also found, but due to the effects of the fire suppression it was difficult to read, but in the end, investigators agreed on the opinion that the inscription could be the name or surname. During later analysis, the inscription was compared to the names of the employees, including the former employees which included Shpagonov.

While recovering, Forseyeva testified against Shpagonov, and he was declared a wanted man by the police. Kovalev was quickly detained, at first giving false testimony, saying that on the day of the robbery, he and his brother went to Kazan to have fun, visiting a cinema and a cafe. However, Kovalev was questioned again, this time warning that if he did not begin to cooperate with the investigation he would be given partial responsibility for the killing of the nine people, later admitting complicity in the raid.

== Arrest and conviction ==
Police received information that Shpagonov had visited his cousin, washed, dressed and left, then he called his former vocational school teacher, so she got in touch with his family and through them gave him warm clothes, as he was about to flee to Siberia. The police found out that the call was made from Agryz, and on the morning of 4 May 1992, Shpagonov was arrested, immediately confessing to the crime and later showing police the place in the river where he threw his gun.

At the trial a few months later, Andrei Shpagonov was sentenced to death, filing petitions for clemency but they were all rejected. Shpagonov had understood that he could face execution, attempting to pass himself off as insane and began talking about the voices in his mind, ordering him to kill, but forensic examination found him sane and able to take responsibility for their actions. On 13 December 1995, Shpagonov was executed by shooting in Kazan.

Dmitri Kovalev was sentenced to 15 years imprisonment for his complicity in the crimes. He was released from prison early in 2005. His subsequent fate is unknown.

Lyalya Forseyeva received an award for her courage.
