= Ptitsyn =

Ptitsyn, feminine: Ptitsyna is a Russian-language surname.

- Igor Ptitsyn, Russian serial killer and rapist
- Larisa Lazutina, née Ptitsyna, Russian cross-country skier
- Mikhail Ptitsyn, Russian lawyer, Chairman of the Moscow City Court
- Roman Ptitsyn, Russian politician
- Protagionist in Alyosha Ptitsyn Grows Up, 1953 Soviet film
