= Main Center for Special Communication =

Federal courier service in Russia

- ФГУП Главный центр специальной связи
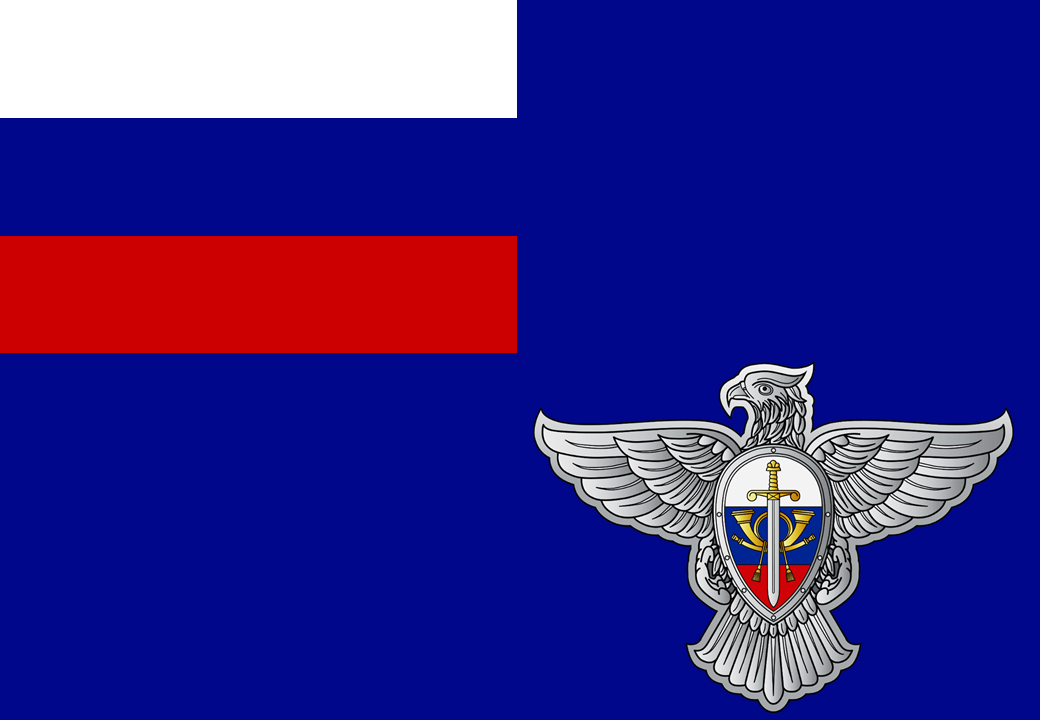
- Flag

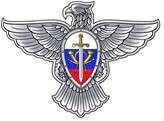
- Emblem

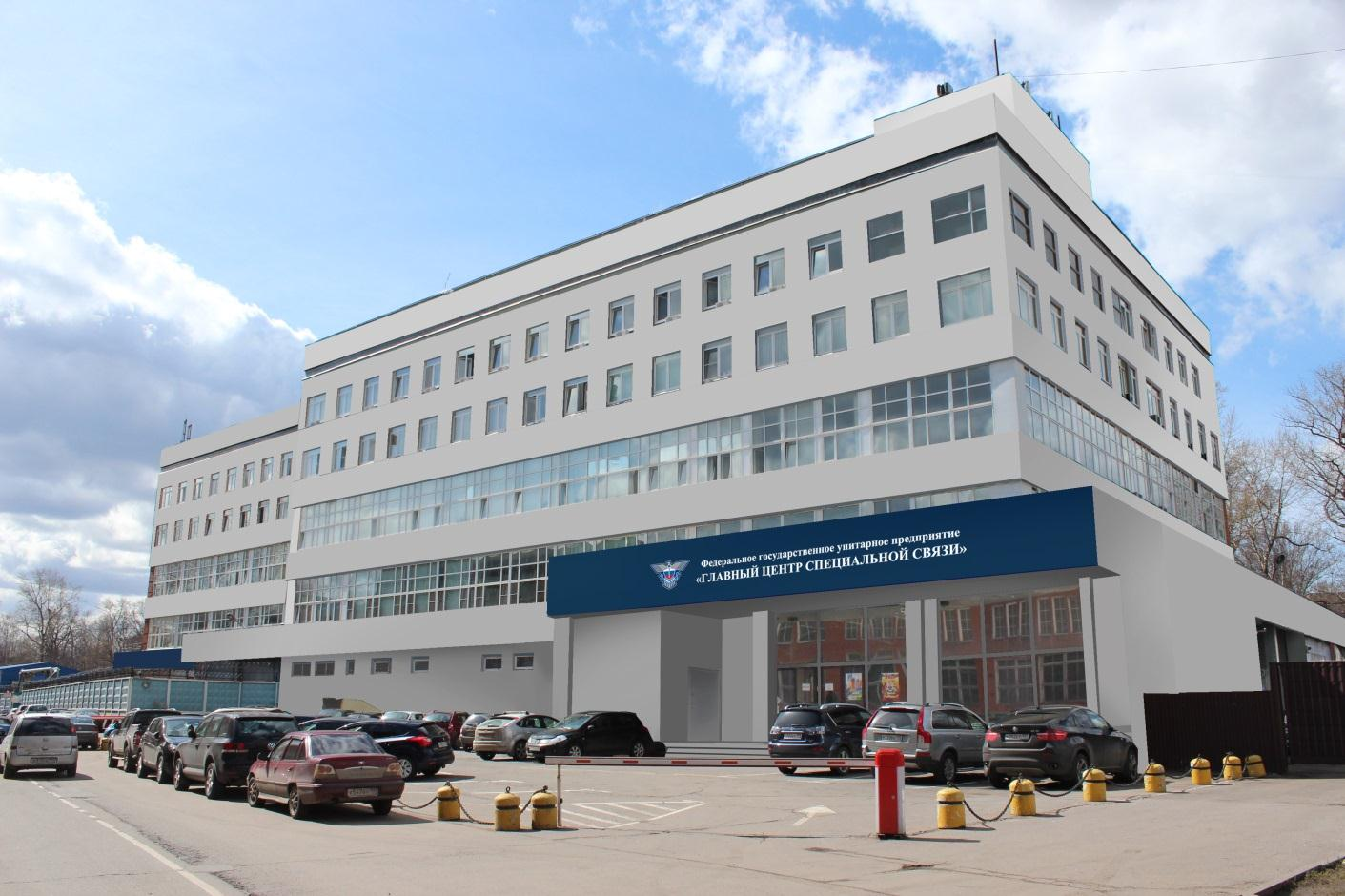
- Headquarters of the Center for Special Communication

Agency overview
- Formed: 1939
- Jurisdiction: Government of Russia
- Headquarters: 1-Ya Mytishchinskaya Street 17, Moscow; 55.8003300181°N 37.6450269265°E
- Parent agency: Ministry of Digital Development, Communications and Mass Media
- Website: www.cccb.ru

The Main Center for Special Communications (Russian: ФГУП «Главный центр специальной связи», abbreviated: ФГУП ГЦССС) is a federal body (unitary enterprise) in Russia subordinated to the Ministry of Communication, which is a courier service responsible for the transfer and delivery of secret and valuable items, medicines, weapons and dangerous goods, including cash, using protected vehicles.

== History ==
The center is the successor of the special communication service of the People's Commissariat of the Interior of the Soviet Union and was the mission communication mechanism of the secret police of the Soviet Union from 1939. In 1988, within the service, the main center for special communication was established. On December 28, 1991, it was reorganized in its current form as a governmental body of the Russian Federation.

The center cooperates with large companies and government bodies in providing transport services and delivery of goods of great importance. The center occupies a significant share of the market for money transfer and cash services in the regions of the country and is considered the most experienced body in providing services in this field and since 2013 its establishments express mail services of goods of utmost importance and money transfer From the currencies to the banks throughout the country As part of the delivery and forwarding services, the center is also responsible for delivering the question forms of the Unified State Exam to the schools and academies and the institutions where the tests are held, Property security and valuable assets that are brought to Russia for display in museums including religious objects, the imperial crown and its replicas that are brought to display in museums throughout Russia. He played a central role in helping to move the government archives from the old building where they were to their new headquarters and was the only body entrusted with providing delivery services in regards to the delivery of postal items during the 2013 Summer Universiade, in which it played a central role as the exclusive delivery body. In addition, the center is responsible for moving the ballot boxes and ballots from the warehouses of the Central Election Commission of Russia to the voting stations, as well as securing the ballot processing system during the elections in the country. Every commodity that the center is responsible for transferring is insured in the amount of one hundred million dollars.

Centralized with a head office in Moscow and regional branches in Saint Petersburg, Kaluga, Nizhny Novgorod, Rostov-on-Don, Saratov, Yekaterinburg, Novosibirsk and Khabarovsk. The center has representations in 71 regions of Russia and over 180 departments and support units of the center operate, including a special communication point at the Baikonur Cosmodrome. The center has at its disposal 7,000 weapons and over 1,700 different means of transportation moving on 1,200 regular routes with a length of 508,000 kilometers.

== See also ==
- Russian Post
- State Courier Service (Russia)
