= Kresty-2 Prison =

Prison in Saint Petersburg, Russia

Kresty-2
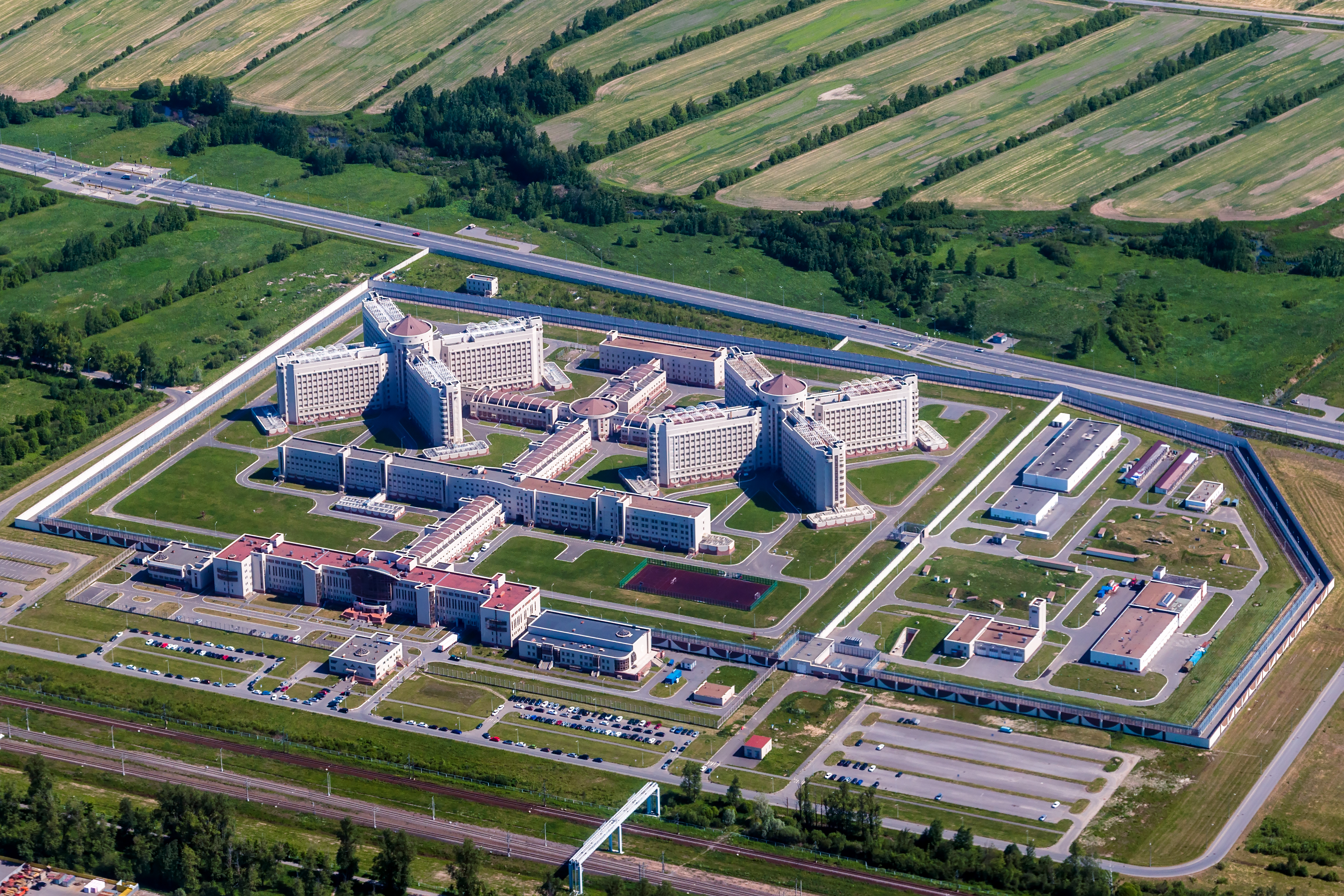
- View of the prison in 2023
- Interactive map of Kresty-2
- Location: Kolpino, Saint Petersburg Russia; 59°44′23″N 30°38′06″E
- Capacity: 4,500
- Opened: 22 December 2017
- Managed by: Federal Penitentiary Service

Federal State Institution Pre-trial Detention Facility No. 1 of the Federal Penitentiary Service for the City of St. Petersburg and the Leningrad Oblast (Russian: Федеральное казённое учреждение Следственный изолятор № 1 Управления Федеральной службы исполнения наказаний по г. Санкт-Петербургу и Ленинградской области), unofficially known as Kresty-2 (Russian: Кресты-2) is a pretrial detention facility in Kolpino, Saint Petersburg. It was opened on December 22, 2017, and replaces the old Kresty Prison, from which it inherited its configuration, as well as its official and unofficial names.

== History ==
In the 1990s, when the already old Kresty Prison was sometimes overcrowded two or three times more than normal, and its condition was already critical, many ideas about creating a new pretrial detention facility appeared in official and unofficial circles. In addition, one of the goals of the project was to move the pretrial detention facility out of the center of Saint Petersburg. Construction of the new prison began in 2007.

Construction progressed slowly due to both underfunding and various technical and bureaucratic problems. A vacant lot near the October Railway, one kilometer from the Kolpino station, was chosen for construction. After preparing the territory and creating a deep pit, construction of the prison itself began. The buildings themselves were erected by 2010, but their delivery was delayed for many years. On December 22, 2017, the prison was formally opened.

== Architecture ==
The Kresty-2 prison has two structural similarities with the old Kresty. The first is the configuration from which they got their name, but unlike the old ones, they have eight floors instead of four. Like the old Kresty, there is a multi-story basement, but unlike them, a bomb shelter is organized underground. The cruciform prison buildings themselves are built at an angle of 45° relative to the perimeter to improve visibility. The perimeter itself is two concrete fences several meters high. The designed capacity of the prison is 4,500 people, one standard cell according to the design fits four people. The toilets in the cells are separated from the main part of the cell by a door, the toilets themselves resemble those in train cars, made of metal and plastic to ensure vandalism resistance. Travelators are organized between the buildings for moving prisoners. All buildings occupy an area of 35 hectares. The buildings have 8 above-ground floors, all of them are connected by covered passages.
