= Kresty Prison =

Prison in Russia

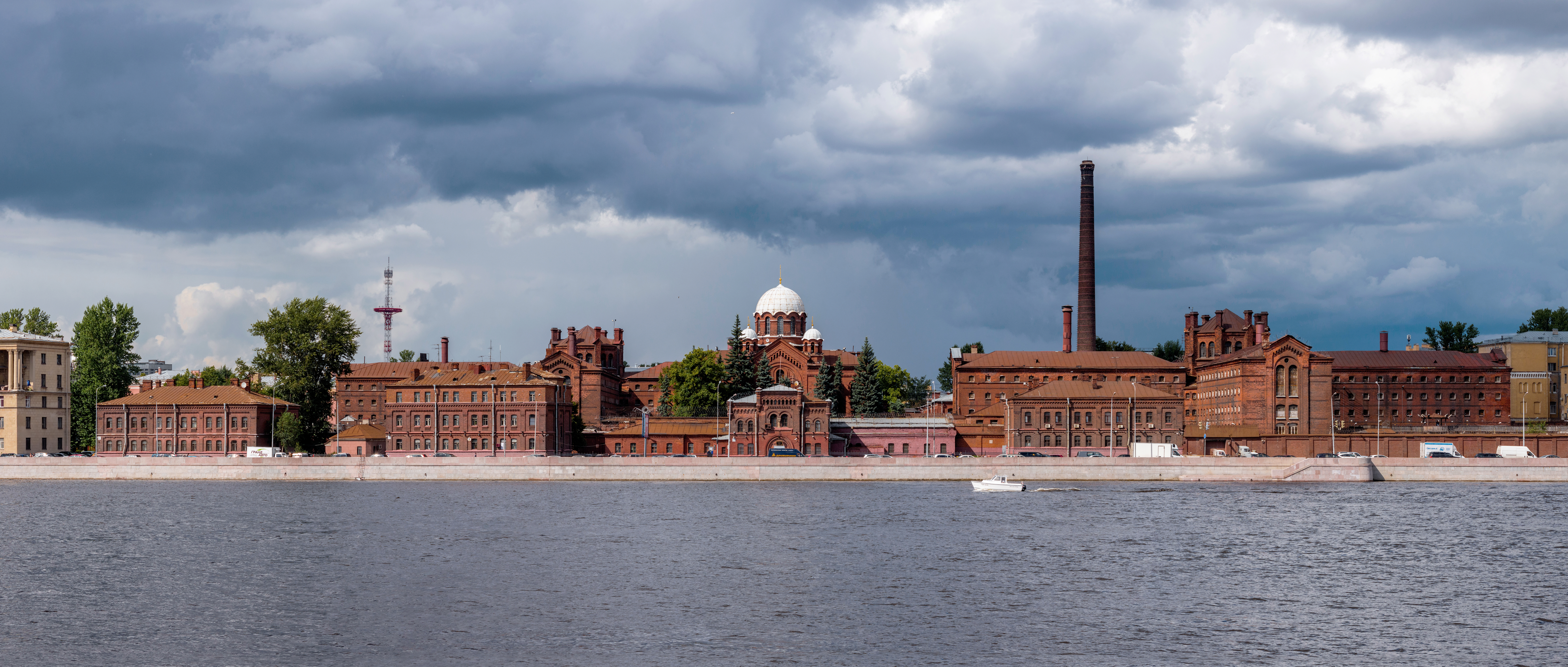
- Interactive map of Kresty Prison
- Location: Saint Petersburg, Russia; 59.9537°N 30.3644°E
- Status: Closed
- Security class: detention center
- Capacity: 1,150
- Opened: 1730s
- Closed: 2017
- Managed by: Saint Petersburg Prison Committee

Kresty (Russian: Кресты, lit. 'Crosses') prison, officially Investigative Isolator No. 1 of the Administration of the Federal Service for the Execution of Punishments for the city of Saint Petersburg (Следственный изолятор № 1 УФСИН по г. Санкт-Петербургу), was a detention center in Saint Petersburg, Russia. The prison consisted of two cross-shaped buildings (hence the name) and the Orthodox Church of St. Alexander Nevsky. The prison had 960 cells and was originally designed for 1,150 detainees.

Kresty was closed and in 2017 the inmates were relocated to a modern prison facility named Kresty-2 Prison.

== Wine warehouse ==
The history of the prison starts in the 1730s. During the reign of Anna Ioannovna, Vinny Gorodok (Wine Town) was a warehouse complex where all the wine for the city of Saint Petersburg was held. After the Emancipation reform of 1861 the need for prison space greatly increased. Before the reforms, serfs were incarcerated by their landowners. After the reforms they were put in state prisons. In 1867 the wine warehouse was transformed into a 700-bed prison, separated into female and male areas. The reconstruction of the wine warehouse was developed by Vladislav Lvov, the chairman of the Saint Petersburg Prison Committee.

== Construction of the new prison ==
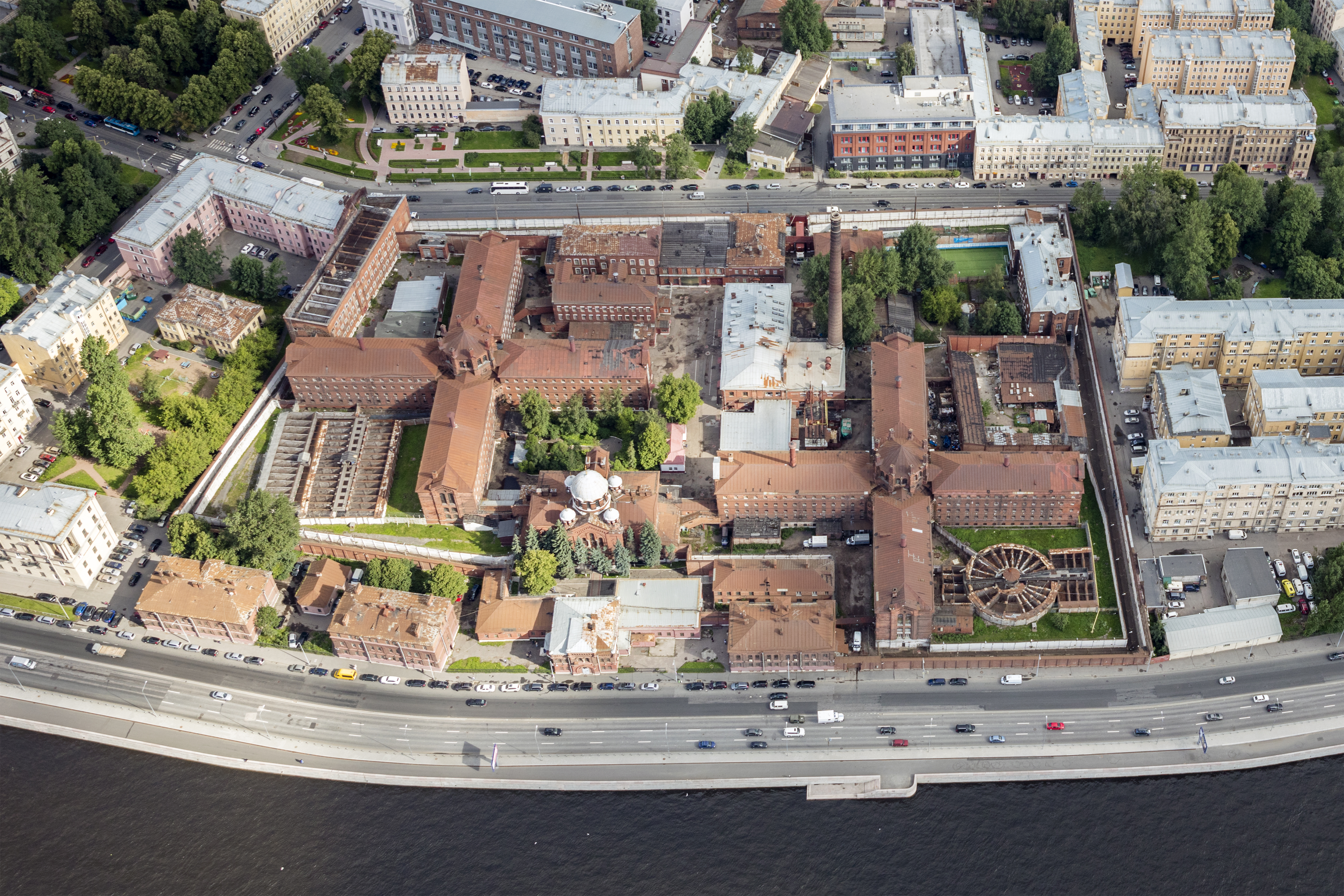
An aerial view of Kresty Prison

In 20 years the prison became too small for the city. The project for the new city prison was developed by Antony Tomishko, a citizen of Austria-Hungary, a member of the Russian Academy of Arts and a staff architect of the Russian State Prison Administration. He was the designer of the Model Uyezd Prison originally built in Staraya Russa and reproduced in Vesyegonsk, Vyazma, Tsaritsyn and other places. Tomishko studied the organization of prisons in Germany and was impressed by the Moabit prison, with three blocks joining a single tower. He appreciated the Philadelphia system that recommended building prisons in the shape of a star with many rays coming from a single observation point. The system was also known as the Panopticon system.

Tomishko designed a prison consisting of two five-storey cross-shaped buildings. The shape of the buildings allowed observation of all the corridors from a single point and also had religious significance, encouraging penance among the inmates. The crosses were joined together by a massive five onion domed red brick Russian Revival church on top of an administrative building. There was a prison hospital, a ward for infectious diseases, a morgue, an ice-room and a blacksmith.

Construction started in 1884 and continued until 1890. It was performed by the inmates of the prison who were kept on the site: a part of the old prison was demolished, then the detainees built the new one while continuing to live in the remaining parts of the old building. Then the prisoners were moved to the new building, the remains of the old building were demolished and construction continued. The prison was one of the first buildings in Russia that used electric lighting, effective ventilation and central heating. In the center of one of the cross-shaped buildings Tomishko installed a monument to English philanthropist and prison reformer John Howard. By the time it was built it was considered the most advanced prison in the world. It was the largest prison in Europe.

According to an urban legend, Tomishko was so proud of his creation that he reported to Tsar Alexander III: "Your Majesty, I have built the prison for you"; "No, you have built it for yourself", supposedly answered the Tsar. The legend continues that besides the 999 official prison cells there is a secret cell number 1000 that still holds the dead body of Tomishko, while his ghost haunts the prison. The legend is almost certainly false. There are only 960 cells in the prison.

== Prison in Imperial Russia ==
In Imperial Russia the prison was officially called Saint Petersburg Prison for Solitary Confinement. It was used for the detention of both common criminals and political prisoners. Among the inmates were: the future Prime Minister of the Russian Provisional Government Alexander Kerensky, the founder of the Constitutional Democratic party Pavel Milyukov, the prominent Bolshevik revolutionaries Leon Trotsky and Vladimir Antonov-Ovseenko, and the future first Soviet People's Commissar of Enlightenment Anatoly Lunacharsky. In 1906 all 200 deputies of the first State Duma of the Russian Empire who had signed the Vyborg Manifesto had to spend three months in Kresty Prison.

On the evening of 12 March [O.S. 27 February] 1917, during the February Revolution, rebellious soldiers and workers who came to a meeting near the Finlyandsky Rail Terminal were led by Mikhail Kalinin to storm Kresty. They stormed the prison from both sides, freed the inmates, and burnt all the prison paperwork in the courtyard. The prime objectives of the Bolsheviks were: 1. To destroy the police records of Bolshevik comrades 2. To deliberately emulate the Storming of the Bastille during the French Revolution. In releasing all the prisoners, a large minority of political prisoners (Bolsheviks, Social Revolutionaries, and trade unionists) were released, along with thieves, debtors, murderers and others, without discrimination.

== After the Revolution ==
After the February Revolution, Kresty became a place of imprisonment for the ministers of the Tsarist government and prominent police officers. After the October Revolution they were joined by people from the Russian Provisional Government, non-Bolshevik politicians and intelligentsia. Among the people imprisoned there were Prime Minister Boris Stürmer, who died in Kresty in September 1917, Justice Minister Ivan Scheglovitov, Minister of the Interior Alexei Khvostov, Minister of War Mikhail Belyayev, former Minister of War Vladimir Sukhomlinov, Chief of Police Yevgeny Klimovich, the great Russian poet Nikolay Gumilyov.

In 1920 the prison was renamed as the Second Special Camp for Involuntary Labor. It was administered by the Petrograd Ispolkom. In 1923 the prison became the Petrograd District Isolation Prison (Петроградская Окружная Изоляционная Тюрьма), part of the Petrograd Cheka system.

During the Great Purges, the prison overflowed with inmates accused of state crimes. Cells designed for solitary confinement often held 15–20 inmates or more. Among the inmates were: painter Kazimir Malevich, poet Nikolay Zabolotsky, historian Lev Gumilyov, poet and writer Daniil Kharms, actor Georgiy Zhzhonov, future Marshal of the Soviet Union Konstantin Rokossovsky and many others. The prison features prominently in Anna Akhmatova's poem Requiem. In the poem she writes:

And if once, whenever in my native land,
They'd think of the raising up my monument,
I give my permission for such good a feast,
But with one condition – they have to place it
Not near the sea, where I once have been born –
All my warm connections with it had been torn,
Not in the tsar’s garden near that tree-stump, blessed,
Where I am looked for by the doleful shade,
But here, where three hundred long hours I stood for
And where was not opened for me the hard door.

Her wish was fulfilled half a century after her death.

On the grounds of the prison operated a sharashka – a research and development facility called OKB-172, that used inmates as weapons engineers and researchers. The facility developed torpedo boats that were widely used by the Soviet Navy during World War II.

During the Siege of Leningrad most detainees were either conscripted into the penal military units of the Soviet Army or transferred to the Eastern regions of Russia. The prison was used for detaining those involved in stealing of food or ration cards, and later for German POWs. Many guards and detainees died of starvation during the siege.

== Post World War 2 ==
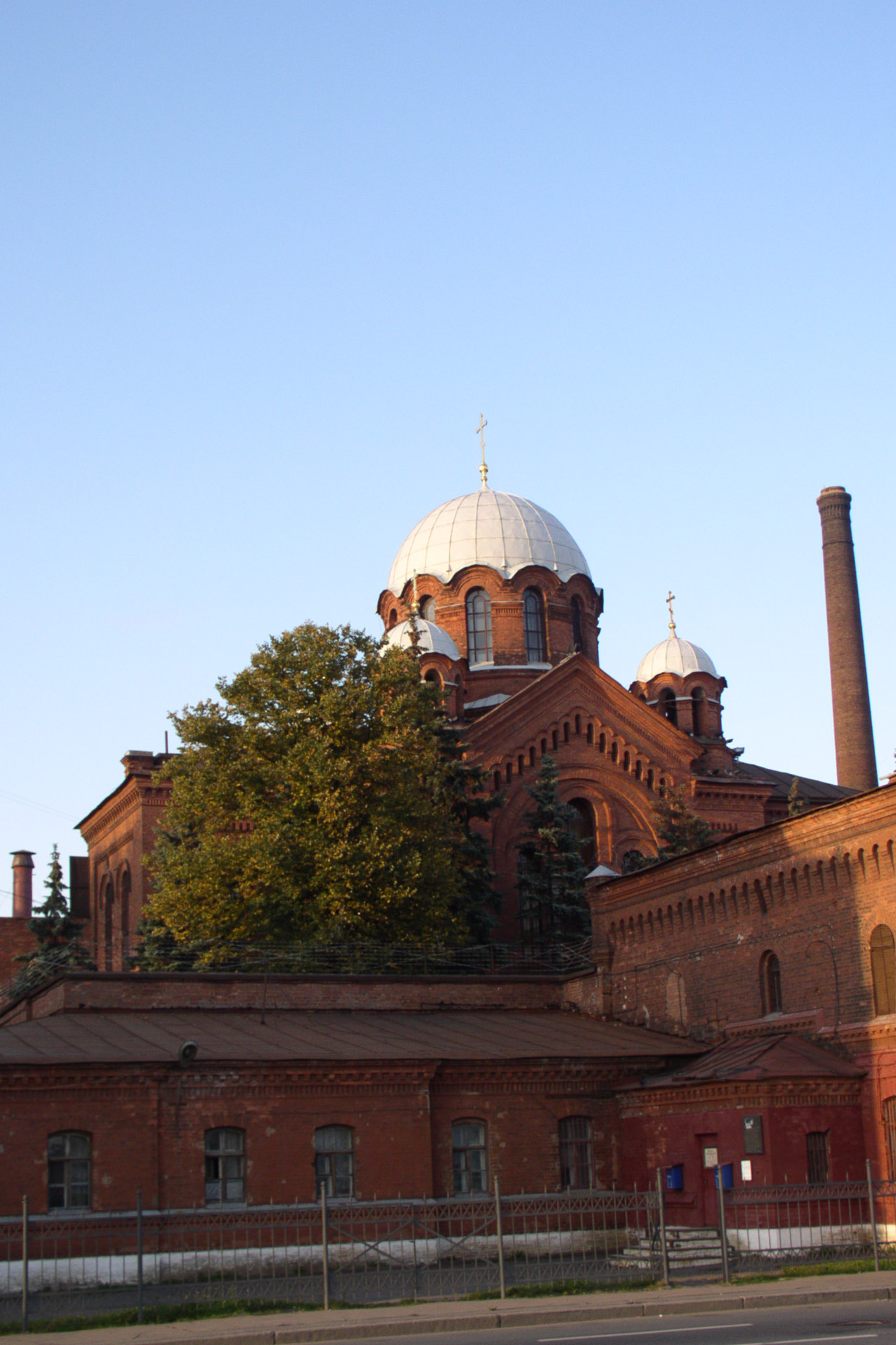
The prison church of St. Alexander Nevsky

In 1964 the prison became a facility used mostly for pre-trial detentions. It was greatly overcrowded: in the mid-1990s the prison held more than 12,500 inmates, more than ten times the design capacity (1,150 inmates). Often a cell originally designed for solitary confinement during the Tsarist period and according to the Soviet rules suitable for only six inmates would actually hold more than 20 inmates. They took turns to sleep on the three-level bunk bed and on the floor. Detention for months or even years in those conditions, often manipulated by the investigators, was often a method to press the suspects. In 1983 the prison was deemed unsuitable for women and minors.

The prison was mostly used for common criminals, but many Soviet dissidents from Leningrad were held there during the investigations and trials.

The judicial reforms of the 1990s made long pre-trial detentions available only with approval of the courts. Currently no more than six inmates can be held in a cell originally designed for solitary confinement.

In 1993 a museum was opened inside the prison devoted to the history of the prison, famous inmates and unusual objects found on the detainees.

In April 1995 the monument To the victims of Political repressions made by Mikhail Shemyakin was installed on the embankment across the Neva River from the prison. It depicts two bronze sphinxes with pretty women's faces as seen from the residential houses on the embankment and bare skulls as seen from the prison's side of the river. There is a stylized window with prison bars between the sphinxes. On the granite base of the monument there are inscriptions with quotes from Nikolay Gumilyov, Osip Mandelstam, Anna Akhmatova, Nikolay Zabolotsky, Daniil Andreyev, Dmitry Likhachev, Joseph Brodsky, Yuri Galanskov, Aleksandr Solzhenitsyn, Vladimir Vysotsky and Vladimir Bukovsky.

In December 2006 a monument to poet Anna Akhmatova by Galina Dodonova was erected across the Neva River opposite the prison according to her will in her poem Requiem. In December 2006 a copy of the monument was installed in a corridor of the prison itself.

In 2025, the prison was auctioned off and bought by the KVS development group for 1.1 billion rubles ($12.5 million). The developer said it was planning to install a museum about the site as well as a hotel complex, restaurants, galleries and public spaces.

== Other notable inmates ==
- Jaba Ioseliani, politician, writer, mobster and leader of the paramilitary organisation Mkhedrioni
- Dmitry Borovikov, Neonazi
- Igor Irtyshov, murderer and child rapist
- Sergey Maduev, brigand who unsuccessfully tried to escape from Kresty
- Andrei Sibiryakov, serial killer and one of the last inmates to be executed in Kresty
- Vladimir Dolgopolov, professional footballer
- Viacheslav Datsik, athlete and convincted felon
- Vladimir Kumarin, businessman and gangster

== Closure ==
In summer 2006 Vladimir Putin (President of Russia) announced that the prison would be relocated to a new facility in the Kolpinsky District on the outskirts of Saint Petersburg. After the relocation is complete the Kresty building will be sold at auction. It is anticipated that the prison building will be transferred into a hotel-entertainment complex. The available options are limited as the prison is considered a protected architectural landmark and only very limited redesign is possible.

== Kresty 2 ==
The new remand prison, Kresty 2, was completed in 2017 in Kolpino, a suburb located 20 miles outside of St. Petersburg. It was constructed at a cost of $378 million. It is built like a small town, containing all the necessary infrastructure: residential quarters, religious buildings, sports facilities, a hospital, workshops, and a hotel for relatives and visitors.
