= Shavkat Shayakhmedov =

Uzbekistani-Russian serial killer and rapist (1960-2023)

- Born: Shavkat Galievich Shayakhmedov; 6 May 1960; Uyghur, Andijan Region, Uzbek SSR
- Died: 23 May 2023 (aged 63); Mordovian Zone, Sosnovka, Mordovia, Russia
- Other names: "The Zalegoshchensky Maniac" "The Zalegoshchensky Beast" "The Oryol Chikatilo"
- Convictions: Murder x4 Rape x8 Child sexual abuse
- Penalty: Life imprisonment

Details
- Victims: 4 convicted 5 confirmed 6+ suspected
- Span of crimes: 1994–2021
- Country: Tajikistan, Russia
- States: Sughd, Oryol
- Date apprehended: 25 August 2021

Shavkat Galievich Shayakhmedov (Russian: Шавкат Галиевич Шаяхмедов; Uzbek: Шавкат Галиевич Шайахмедов 6 May 1960 – 23 May 2023), known as the Zalegoshchensky Maniac (Russian: Залегощенский маньяк, romanized: Zalegoshchenskiy manyak), was an Uzbekistani-Russian serial killer and rapist who committed at least five murders in Tajikistan and Russia from 1994 to 2021, four of which were children. Convicted for his four known murders in the latter country, he was given a life term and died behind bars in 2023.

== Biography ==
=== Early life ===
Little is known about Shayakhmedov's early life, aside from the fact that he was born in 1960 and hails from Uygur, a village in the Uzbek SSR's Andijan Region. He would later claim that he was sexually abused by one of his relatives, but this was never corroborated.

After graduating from a vocational school, Shayakhmedov was drafted into the Soviet Army in the early 1980s. Upon completing his service in the mid-1980s, he moved to Istiqlol in the Tajik SSR, where he soon married a local woman who would give birth to twins—a son named Roman and a daughter named Ruzilya—on 29 September 1988. Shayakhmedov would claim later on that he had to move away from his native village after ethnic Uzbeks demanded that he learn their language or be forced out.

=== Move to Russia ===
In the mid-1990s, Shayakhmedov and his family left Tajikistan and headed for Russia, where he found accommodation in Kazar, Oryol Oblast. Soon afterwards, he found a job as a mechanic for local enterprises, due to which he gained a reputation as a hard worker. Since the work was difficult but well paid, Shayakhmedov eventually gathered enough money to buy his own house in the village sometime in the mid-2000s.

In contrast to his financial success, Shayakhmedov's reputation as a person was met with mixed feelings from locals. On one hand, he was noted for never having a criminal record, but on the other, he was known to frequently drink alcohol and smoke marijuana, which eventually led to his own children developing the same addiction as him. Most alarmingly, he was suspected of physically and sexually abusing his daughter, as she was never allowed to leave the house after graduating school and was forbidden from going to university, leading to several suicide attempts in the early 2010s. Despite these claims, his wife claimed that Shayakhmedov had no negative influence on his children and constantly made excuses about his questionable behavior and actions.

On 1 June 2013, Shayakhmedov's son Roman died of a heart attack at age 25, having drunk a large quantity of alcohol mixed with coffee on the day of his death. Three months later, Ruzilya died from complications brought on by cirrhosis. Shayakhmedov would claim in a later interview that he would frequently experience nightmares in which his deceased children would call out to him.

Shortly after their deaths, Shayakhmedov quit his high-paying job and instead began working as a plumber at the Zalegoshchenskaya Secondary General Education School No. 2, where he was regarded positively by the school administration. During his stay there, he also gained popularity with the students, as he often treated them to cigarettes and sweets. In the late 2010s, he was accused of sexual harassment by several female students, one of whom claimed that he had taken her behind a wooden toilet on the school grounds and started touching her intimate parts, but she managed to break free and inform her classmates and acquaintances. Despite the gravity of the accusations, the students' claims were largely ignored.

== Murders ==
The first murder that has been conclusively linked to Shayakhmedov that was committed in Russia occurred in April 2000, when he raped and strangled a 6-year-old boy in Zalegoshch. After killing him, he dumped the boy's body in a nearby ravine.

In September 2003, Shayakhmedov went out fishing and came across a 32-year-old woman who was visiting acquaintances in Kazar. Taking advantage of the fact that she was asleep and drunk, he attacked and subsequently raped her. Fearing that she would somehow remember his face if left alive, he then strangled her and dumped the body on the outskirts of the village near a railroad bridge, where it was discovered a few days later.

On 27 July 2005, 11-year-old Konstantin Bolotov left his grandmother's house in Kazar to go for a bike ride but failed to return home. A few days later, his bike was found by a local resident named Anatoly Abashin, who for some time was considered the prime suspect in the boy's disappearance, but no charges were ever brought against him. Aside from Abashin, several other suspects were considered, including some workers from the Rostov Oblast who were working on a road surface in the area. Local police theorized that Bolotov was killed by accident and then the workers rolled his corpse in asphalt, but no evidence corroborated this theory.

On the day Bolotov disappeared, his neighbour Shayakhmedov invited the young boy to help pick mushrooms. After luring Bolotov to a forest outside the village of Orekhovka, Shayakhmedov proceeded to attack and rape him, ultimately strangling the boy to death after he threatened to tell his grandmother. In order to hide the body, he dug up a shallow grave and buried it there. It was only after Shayakhmedov's arrest, and only after the investigation unit had to dig up almost 3 hectares, that his skeletonized remains and decaying clothing were located.

On 18 June 2021, Shayakhmedov committed his last murder, with the victim being another neighbour, 9-year-old Viktoria Gnedova. On the day of the murder, she went to his basement and demanded that Shayakhmedov buy a motorcycle that he had promised to give her, but he refused; instead, he grabbed a nearby hammer and hit her several times on the head, killing her. Investigators suspected that this occurred after Gnedova threatened to tell her parents about the sexual abuse she had experienced at Shayakhmedov's hands on previous occasions; he initially denied this but later admitted that it was exactly the case.

=== Search for Gnedova and investigation ===
Shortly after Gnedova's disappearance, Governor Andrey Klychkov launched a campaign to locate the young girl, appealing to residents across Oryol Oblast, the neighbouring regions, and social media to help in the search. Thousands of concerned citizens from Kursk, Tambov, Belgorod, Bryansk, Voronezh, Tula, and Moscow Oblasts volunteered for the campaign, in addition to local and regional security personnel. During the search, wells, landfills, basements, outhouses, forest belts, and a number of industrial enterprises were inspected, with a sugar factory near Kazar pumping out its tanks full of raw material to rule out an accident. A number of reservoirs and bodies of water were also inspected by diving teams, but this also yielded no results. Eventually, the case was handed over to Alexander Bastrykin, the head of the Investigative Committee of Russia. According to Armen Yeghiazaryan, the Deputy Head of the Ministry of Internal Affairs, law enforcement worked tirelessly to pursue any and all leads, especially those concerning former convicts who had committed sexual offences.

In August, a tablet was found in the bushes near the apartment building where Viktoria Gnedova lived. Realizing that it belonged to the girl, it was immediately checked for fingerprints, with forensic scientists discovering that while there were no usable fingerprints, there was DNA from Viktoria and her family members, as well as that of their upstairs neighbour, Shavkat Shayakhmedov. He was soon brought in for interrogation, but he claimed to have an alibi for the day of the crime, claiming that he was at work at the time. A check of the timesheets revealed that he had indeed been at school at the time, but a number of schoolchildren and locals soon came forward to testify against Shayakhmedov, revealing that many of them had seen him wandering the streets and buying sweets from the grocery store.

From these interviews, two sisters would come forward, claiming that they had been abused as minors by Shayakhmedov, placing the date of the attack somewhere between 10 and 31 August 2005. According to them, Shayakhmedov had come to visit their father, with the two men drinking until late in the night. Once their father fell asleep, Shayakhmedov burst into their room and sexually assaulted both of the victims, who were aged 7 and 9, respectively. They claimed that they never informed anyone about the crime until now because they feared the publicity and the possibility that they would be unable to confirm that a rape had actually occurred.

== Arrest, trial and sentence ==
Based on the sisters' testimony, Shayakhmedov was arrested on 26 August 2021, and a criminal case was opened against him. A few days later, unable to withstand pressure from the investigators, he confessed to the murder of Gnedova and offered to show law enforcement where he buried the body. On 15 September, her remains were exhumed in the place indicated by Shayakhmedov, with DNA tests conclusively proving that the remains belonged to Gnedova.

Olga Martynova, Gnedova's mother, would later reveal that she and her husband were the initial prime suspects in the disappearance, alleging that investigators had attempted to bribe her into confessing just to see what her reaction would be. After Shayakhmedov's arrest, she described his demeanour as completely calm, appearing to be unfazed by the fact that he had violated and murdered a little girl.

In order to get rid of the body, he buried the young girl's body in a corner of the cellar underneath her parents' apartment. To do so, he dug a tunnel under the foundation of the load-bearing wall of the structure, in which he placed the corpse, almost completely obscuring it from view aside from her feet, which were hidden by laying ceramic tiles. After this, Shayakhmedov filled the remaining holes with construction material and various garbage to cover them up. While a search operation was conducted by police officers, including in the basement, the probe was unable to detect traces of the body due to the ceramic tiles, from which the search initially had no results.

In late September, Shayakhmedov was charged with Gnedova's murder. Only a few days later, he unexpectedly confessed to three more murders for which he had never been considered a suspect, as well as the rapes of three underage girls committed between 2005 and 2018. His confessions proved to consist of knowledge only the perpetrator could have, and in November, all the subsequent criminal cases were merged into one big trial. Per the indictment, Shayakhmedov faced multiple charges of murder, rape, child sexual abuse, and a myriad of related charges.

The trial officially began on 25 October 2022, and was held behind closed doors. In it, Shayakhmedov's lawyer, Yulia Olenicheva, insisted on his innocence, claiming that her client had been beaten up by investigators and pressured into confessing. To back up her claims, she presented photographs and medical reports, which showed that Shayakhmedov suffered numerous bruises and hematomas inflicted by blunt objects during his stay in the detention centre. No explanation was given about the origin of the bruises.

Despite this, on 22 December, Shayakhmedov was convicted on the four murder and rape charges, fully admitting his guilt in spite of his lawyer's protests. As he suffered a stroke during the investigation and was partially paralyzed, he appeared at court hearings in a wheelchair. A week after his conviction, Shayakhmedov was sentenced to life imprisonment.

Following the conclusion of the trial, the victims' relatives attempted to have Shayakhmedov's wife prosecuted as well, as they believed that she was aware of her husband's crimes and never reported him to the police. Martynova claimed that sometime after her daughter went missing, she overheard an argument between the Shayakhmedovs in which the wife supposedly said that she had helped him avoid arrest even before they moved to Russia, implying that he had committed other crimes.

== New confessions and death ==
In early 2023, Shayakhmedov was transported to the Mordovian Zone to serve out his sentence, but shortly after his arrival, he unexpectedly confessed to a fifth murder, which he claimed took place in Tajikistan in 1994. According to him, on 21 May 1994, he killed 8-year-old Katya Dmitrieva in Istiqlol, where he lived with his family at the time. The girl was last seen alive in the afternoon in her family's yard on Stroiteley Street, and upon realizing she was gone, her parents organized a large-scale search with the help of volunteers but were unable to find the girl. Shayakhmedov stated that he lured Dmitrieva to his garage, where he raped and strangled her. He then transported the body via motorcycle to his mother-in-law's house on 19 Kamoli Khujandi Street, where he buried her under the house's foundation in a similar manner to the later murder of Gnedova.

On 23 May 2023, Shayakhmedov died from health complications brought on by his stroke. His family and relatives refused to claim his body, and he was thus buried in a grave next to the Mordovian Zone.

=== Search and potential further victims ===
Following Shayakhmedov's death, representatives of Russia's Ministry of Internal Affairs and the General Prosecutor's Office in Tajikistan travelled to Istiqlol in the summer of 2023, where they unearthed skeletal remains at the indicated place. The entire process was recorded by Tajikistani security services, and subsequent DNA examinations confirmed that the skeletal remains belonged to Dmitrieva. With his guilt conclusively proven in this crime, rumours began to spread that Shayakhmedov possibly might have killed other victims during the Soviet years, while he lived in Uzbekistan and Tajikistan. It was also speculated that he frequently moved to avoid arrest if crimes were linked back to him.

Aside from this, Shayakhmedov confessed to a fifth murder that took place in Russia shortly before his death, with the victim being a child who was killed somewhere within the city of Oryol. As of October 2023, the investigation into this supposed victim is still ongoing.

== In media and culture ==
In May 2023, the Russia-24 channel aired a programme titled "On the Trail of the Beast" (Russian: По следу зверя), which covered the Shayakhmedov case and even featured an interview he gave to reporters detailing his life and the circumstances of his crimes. At the end of the interview, Shayakhmedov stated that what he had done was unforgivable and that he fully agreed with the sentence handed down to him.

== See also ==
- List of Russian serial killers
- List of serial killers active in the 2020s
