= Oleg Kuznetsov (serial killer) =

Soviet-Russian serial killer and rapist

- Kuznetsov's passport photo
- Born: Oleg Vladimirovich Kuznetsov; 30 April 1969; Balashikha, Moscow Oblast, RSFSR, Soviet Union
- Died: 4 August 2000 (aged 31); Mordovian Zone, Sosnovka, Mordovia, Russia
- Other names: "The Balashikha Ripper" "False Dmitry"; Dmitry Fadeev
- Convictions: Murder; Rape
- Penalty: Death; commuted to life imprisonment

Details
- Victims: 10
- Span of crimes: 1991–1992
- Country: Soviet Union, later Russia and Ukraine
- States: Moscow, Kyiv
- Date apprehended: 26 March 1992

Oleg Vladimirovich Kuznetsov (Russian: Оле́г Влади́мирович Кузнецо́в; 30 April 1969 – 4 August 2000), known as The Balashikha Ripper (Russian: Балашихинский Джек-потрошитель), was a Soviet-Russian serial killer and rapist. Between 1991 and 1992, he killed 10 girls and women between the ages of 15 and 30.

== Biography ==
Born and raised in Balashikha, Moscow Oblast, Kuznetsov's parents divorced when the boy was just five years old. He lived with his father since he did not get along with his mother. As a child and adolescent he was extremely asocial, but he had an active sexual life, which he began at age 16. He was also a master of biathlon, graduated 8 classes, later GPTU. He studied in the DOSAAF, was drafted into the army, and served in Kyiv.

From 1985 to 1988, before and during his army service, Kuznetsov committed several rapes.

== Murders ==
He committed his first known murder on 7 May 1991. Kuznetsov worked at the time as a taxi driver. The victim asked him to drive to her house. On the road, Kuznetsov talked to the girl, offering her a drink. Kuznetsov stopped the car near the Kupavna neighbourhood. There, the couple had sex, but in the morning the girl told him that he had to pay for the "night of love" or she would report him to the police. This enraged Kuznetsov, who killed her on the spot. He disposed of her body in a nearby mound, where it was later found by passers-by.

From May to November 1991 he committed a series of rapes in Balashikha.

On the night of 12–13 November 1991, threatening the victim with a knife, he committed another rape in one of the Balashikha cemeteries. The victim recognized the rapist and reported him to the authorities. Taking advantage of the collapse of the USSR and the separation of Ukraine, he moved to Kyiv, where he once served, believing that in the confusion associated with the disintegration of the country, no one would be looking for him there. From then on, he decided to kill his rape victims so they couldn't report him to the police.

In Kyiv, he committed four murders involving rape and robbery: on 6, 19, 24, and 27 January 1992. Some of his victims' eyes were gouged out. The last attack was unsuccessful: the girl, to whom Kuznetsov introduced himself as "Dmitry Fadeev from Balashikha", fought back and gave a description of the attacker. In the operational and investigative circles, he was nicknamed "False Dmitry". In February, he moved to Moscow, where he committed five more murders, similar in style to those in Kyiv on 25 February, and 3, 9, 13, and 21 March 1992. He committed his crimes in the east of the capital, in Izmaylovsky Park.

He was arrested on 26 March 1992, and confessed to all murders and rapes. On 1 December 1993, the court process began. He was sentenced to death, but since by that time Russia had joined the Council of Europe, in 1999 the sentence was commuted to life imprisonment. He was serving his sentence in the colony of special regime IK-1 "Mordovian zone", in the Sosnovka settlement of Zubovo-Polyansky District in the Republic of Mordovia.

Oleg Kuznetsov died of heart failure on 4 August 2000, aged 31.

== See also ==
- List of serial killers by country
- List of serial killers by number of victims

== Notes ==
- Зона мертвеца. Маньяки. Олег Кузнецов
- Сексуальные маньяки. Кузнецов Олег Владимирович — Лжедмитрий
- Отечественные серийные убийцы разных лет (кон. 20-го — нач. 21-го столетий)
- «След зверя»
