= Aleksandr Kalashnikov (government official) =

- Александр Калашников

Head of the Federal Penitentiary Service
- In office 8 October 2019 – 25 November 2021
- President: Vladimir Putin
- Prime Minister: Mikhail Mishustin
- Preceded by: Gennady Kornienko
- Succeeded by: Arkady Gostev

Personal details
- Born: 27 January 1964 (age 62) Soviet Union
- Party: Independent
- Education: Institute of the FSB of Russia; Novosibirsk Higher Military Command School of the Ministry of Internal Affairs of Russia

Military service
- Allegiance: Russia
- Branch/service: Police of Russia
- Rank: Lieutenant general

Aleksandr Petrovich Kalashnikov (Russian: Александр Петрович Калашников; born January 27, 1964) is a Russian state official. A Lieutenant General (2018), he served as the Director of the Federal Penitentiary Service of Russia from October 8, 2019, to November 25, 2021, stepping down amid a scandal involving the torture of inmates in pre-trial detention centers and penal colonies. He previously served as the head of the FSB directorates for the Komi Republic and Krasnoyarsk Krai (2011–2019).

== Biography ==
He holds a higher education degree. In 1985, he graduated from the Novosibirsk Higher Military Command School of the Internal Troops of the USSR Ministry of Internal Affairs (MVD). From 1985 to 1987, he commanded a platoon in the 236th Convoy Regiment of the 36th Convoy Division of the USSR MVD; his duties included escorting detainees in "Stolypin" (prison) rail cars.

He began his service with the KGB of the USSR in 1987, later continuing with the FSB of Russia. He completed the Higher Courses of Military Counterintelligence of the KGB in Novosibirsk, and in 1995, he graduated from the FSB Academy in Moscow. He began his career as an operative, eventually rising to become the deputy head of a division within the FSB's central apparatus. Prior to this, he served in the FSB's "M" Directorate, where he was tasked with overseeing other security and law enforcement agencies.

In June 2011, he was appointed head of the FSB Directorate for the Komi Republic, a position he held until May 2017. In May 2017, he was appointed head of the FSB Directorate for Krasnoyarsk Krai. By a decree of the President of Russia dated June 15, 2012, Kalashnikov was promoted to the military rank of Major General, and in the summer of 2018, to Lieutenant General.

On October 8, 2019, by Decree No. 486 of the President of the Russian Federation, he was appointed Director of the Federal Penitentiary Service, succeeding Gennady Kornienko. On October 17, 2019, he was introduced to the leadership and staff of the Federal Penitentiary Service.

On November 25, 2021, by a decree of the President of the Russian Federation, he was relieved of his position as Director of the Federal Penitentiary Service.

His dismissal followed the release by human rights activists from the organization Gulagu.net of a 40-gigabyte archive containing videos, photographs, and documents detailing instances of torture and rape within the penal system, as well as a series of criminal cases initiated by the Investigative Committee of Russia regarding the use of violence against convicts. According to official statements, there is no direct link between the reports of torture and his removal from office. However, the Interfax news agency, citing an informed source, reported that Kalashnikov's resignation was connected to the case involving the torture of convicts. He was succeeded by Arkady Gostev.

== Awards ==
- Jubilee Medal "70 Years of the Armed Forces of the USSR"
- Fyodor Haass Medal
- Medal "For Combat Cooperation"
- ru
- Medal "In Commemoration of the 850th Anniversary of Moscow"
- Medal "For Impeccable Service"
- Medal "200 Years of the Russian Interior Ministry"
