= Sergei Ryakhovsky =

Russian serial killer

- Серге́й Ряховский
- Born: Sergei Vasilyevich Ryakhovsky; 29 December 1962; Balashikha, Moscow Oblast, Soviet Union
- Died: 12 November 2007 (aged 44); Mordovian Zone, Sosnovka, Mordovia, Russia
- Other names: The Balashikha Ripper; The Hippopotamus
- Height: 1.98 m (6 ft 6 in)
- Conviction: Murder
- Penalty: Death (commuted to life imprisonment)

Details
- Victims: 18 (convicted); 24 (confessed)
- Span of crimes: 1988–1993
- Country: Soviet Union, Russia
- Weapons: Screwdriver, kitchen knife
- Date apprehended: 13 April 1993

Sergei Vasilyevich Ryakhovsky (Russian: Серге́й Васильевич Ряховский; 29 December 1962 – 12 November 2007) was a Soviet-Russian serial killer, convicted for the killing of 18 people in the Moscow area between 1988 and 1993.

== Background ==
Sergei Vasilyevich Ryakhovsky was born on 29 December 1962, in the Saltykovka area of Balashikha, Moscow Oblast, a city 1 kilometre (0.62 mi) east of Moscow. Ryakhovsky was 6 ft 6 in (198 cm) tall and weighed 280 pounds (130 kg). In 1982, Ryakhovsky claimed he began to feel "an irresistible desire for intimacy with a woman", and made several attempts to rape elderly women in the Golyanovo area of east Moscow, for which he was convicted of hooliganism and received a four-year sentence in prison. For his rape attempts in the past (in the hierarchy of Soviet prisoners, rape was considered an unworthy crime, unlike theft and robbery), he was raped by other inmates, which led him to hate homosexuals and conclude that victims should not be left alive.

== Murders ==
In June 1988, Ryakhovsky committed his first murder when he killed a homosexual man in Bitsa, a village in Moscow Oblast on the outskirts of Moscow. The same year he killed three homosexual men in Izmaylovsky Park, which Ryakhovsky claimed was part of his personal mission to "cleanse" society by killing homosexuals and prostitutes. Despite this, the majority of his victims between 1988 and 1993 were elderly women, although he also killed five men and two teenagers. Ryakhovsky's main methods of killing were stabbing or strangulation with his bare hands or a rope, and after the victim had died he mutilated the bodies, mainly in the genital area. Some corpses of Ryakhovsky's victims would have sexual acts performed upon them, including male ones. In January 1993, Ryakhovsky murdered a 73-year-old man, cut off his head with a hunting knife and, one day later, returned to cut off his leg. His next victim, a 65-year-old woman, had her abdomen ruptured with a weak pyrotechnical device. He hanged, eviscerated, and then decapitated his penultimate victim, a 16-year-old boy, with a knife.

== Arrest and conviction ==
During a routine search of a crime scene area, police investigators found a shack with a noose fixed to the ceiling. Considering it a part of the preparation for the next murder, they decided to set an ambush. On 13 April 1993, Ryakhovsky arrived at the shack and was subsequently arrested by the police officers. Despite his considerable strength and violent temperament, Ryakhovsky showed absolutely no resistance, later admitting that after seeing weapons in the hands of officers he became frozen with fear. The Russian press nicknamed Ryakhovsky "The Balashikha Ripper" and "The Hippopotamus" because of his thick neck and hulking posture. During the investigation Ryakhovsky co-operated with officials and investigators, willingly indicating crime scenes and describing methods of killing. According to his confessions, most murders were not planned and were rather an effect of a sudden impulse, which was used to explain the motivation behind the murder of a 70-year-old woman and 78-year-old man Ryakhovsky had accidentally met in the forest. There was an exception, as his first murder of the homosexual he had met in Izmailovski Park in 1988 were thoroughly planned. Most victims were people over 40 and around 50 years of age, while three of his victims were over 60.

According to psychiatrists from the Moscow Serbsky Institute, Ryakhovsky's necrophiliac tendencies were caused by a malfunction in his central nervous system. He was evaluated as sane, competent for trial and fully responsible for his actions. However, after being informed of his diagnosis, Ryakhovsky's behaviour changed dramatically. At first, complacent and fully cooperating with the investigators, he suddenly became obstructive, stopped cooperating, began demanding punishment for the experts, and also revoked his previous confessions. During the 1993 Russian constitutional crisis, Ryakhovsky, hoping for the victory of the Supreme Soviet, wrote a letter to Alexander Rutskoy claiming that he was an innocent victim of the «anti-popular government».

Like many serial killers, Ryakhovsky kept a diary counting his murders and attacks. He also wrote a science fiction novel called «Starfall», which recounted the daily life of a future state security officer nicknamed «Commodore», who carried out "cleansing" operations on planets and pirate spaceships with the help of a group of robots under his command. Ryakhovsky wrote three versions of the story, none of which were ever finished. There was no clear plot or completeness in the text. The text focused primarily on the executions of pirates and bandits: the "Commodore" either burned them with a flamethrower or threw them into open space.

He was sent to the Mordovian Zone prison. While in prison, he read Isaac Asimov, Ray Bradbury, Robert Sheckley, and other favorite science fiction writers.

In July 1995, Ryakhovsky was sentenced to death by firing squad, and after hearing the verdict said: "I will be back". However, in 1996 Russia imposed a moratorium on executions, instead the sentence was commuted to life imprisonment in a maximum-security penal colony in Sosnovka, Zubovo-Polyansky District, Mordovia.

== Death ==
Ryakhovsky died on 12 November 2007 from long untreated tuberculosis while serving his sentence in prison.

== See also ==
- List of Russian serial killers
- List of serial killers by number of victims
