= Arkady Gostev =

- Аркадий Гостев
- Gostev in 2025

Head of the Federal Penitentiary Service
- In office 25 November 2021 – Incumbent
- President: Vladimir Putin
- Prime Minister: Mikhail Mishustin
- Preceded by: Aleksandr Kalashnikov

Deputy Minister of Internal Affairs
- In office 14 June 2012 – 25 November 2021

Personal details
- Born: 11 February 1961 (age 65) Soviet Union
- Education: Moscow Higher School of Militiya; Academy of Management of the Russian Ministry of Internal Affairs

Military service
- Allegiance: Russia
- Branch/service: Police of Russia
- Rank: Colonel-general

Arkady Alexandrovich Gostev (Russian: Аркадий Александрович Гостев; born February 11, 1961, in the Shatsky District, Ryazan Oblast) is a Russian law enforcement official. He has served as the Director of the Federal Penitentiary Service of Russia since November 25, 2021, and holds the rank of General of the Internal Service (awarded in 2023).

== Biography ==
Arkady Alexandrovich Gostev was born on February 11, 1961, in the Shatsky District of the Ryazan Oblast.

He has served within the Ministry of Internal Affairs system since 1981.

Beginning September 2, 1981, he served as a police officer (in the then Militsiya) in the 162nd Company of the Patrol and Guard Service Battalion under the Internal Affairs Directorate (UVD) of the Sovetsky District Executive Committee in Moscow.

In 1987, he graduated from the Moscow Higher School of the Soviet Ministry of Internal Affairs with a degree in law.

His career progressed from investigator in the investigative department of the Sovetsky District UVD in Moscow to deputy head of the department—specifically, head of the division for the investigation of organized crime within the investigative department of the UVD for the Southern Administrative District of Moscow.

In 2000, he graduated from the First Faculty of the Academy of Management of the Russian Ministry of Internal Affairs.

From 2001 to 2003, he served as deputy head of the directorate and chief of staff for the UVD of the Southern Administrative District of Moscow.

In 2006, he became the acting head of the Directorate for Public Order Maintenance under the Main Internal Affairs Directorate (GUVD) for the city of Moscow. On April 23, 2007, he was appointed head of the Directorate for Public Order Maintenance for the Main Internal Affairs Directorate of Moscow. In June 2010, he was named deputy head of the Main Internal Affairs Directorate for the city of Moscow, serving concurrently as chief of staff.

Following the reorganization of the Moscow Main Directorate, he was granted the special rank of Major General of the Internal Service on April 14, 2011, and was appointed deputy head of the Main Directorate of the Ministry of Internal Affairs of the Russian Federation for the city of Moscow. On June 14, 2012, he was granted the special rank of Major General of the Police and appointed Deputy Minister of Internal Affairs of the Russian Federation.

On February 21, 2014, he was granted the special rank of Lieutenant General of the Police.

On February 20, 2016, he was granted the special rank of Colonel General of the Police.

By Decree of the President of Russia No. 675 dated November 25, 2021, he was appointed Director of the Federal Penitentiary Service.

By Decree of the President of Russia No. 716 dated December 20, 2021, he was granted the special rank of Colonel General of the Internal Service.

By Decree of the President of Russia No. 871 dated November 22, 2023, he was granted the special rank of General of the Internal Service.

== Awards ==
- Order "For Merit to the Fatherland"
- Order of Alexander Nevsky
- Order of Honour
- Medal "For Distinction in the Protection of Public Order"
- Medal "For Valour in Service"
- Medal "For Combat Cooperation"
- Medal "In Commemoration of the 850th Anniversary of Moscow"
- Medal "For Impeccable Service"
- Medal in Commemoration of 200 Years to the MVD
- Medal "For Cooperation with the FSB of Russia"
- Medal in Commemoration of "200 Years of the Ministry of Defence"
- Medal "For Strengthening of Combat Cooperation"
- Medal "Participant of the military operation in Syria"
- Honorary Staff Member of the Ministry of Internal Affairs
