= Igor Irtyshov =

Russian serial child rapist and child murderer (1971-2021)

- Игорь Иртышов
- Born: Igor Anatolievich Irtyshov; 16 August 1971; Krasny Khutor, Krasnodar Krai, RSFSR
- Status: Deceased
- Died: February 2021 (aged 49); Mordovian Zone Special Regime Colony, Sosnovka, Zubovo-Polyansky District, Mordovia, Russia
- Other name: "The Prostitute Maniac"
- Convictions: Murder x2 Rape x6 Sexual assault
- Penalty: Death; commuted to life imprisonment

Details
- Victims: 2 murders, 7 rapes
- Span of crimes: 1993–1994
- Country: Russia
- State: St. Petersburg
- Date apprehended: 28 November 1994
- Imprisoned at: Mordovian Zone, Sosnovka, Republic of Mordovia

Igor Anatolievich Irtyshov (Russian: Игорь Анатольевич Иртышов; born 16 August 1971 — died February 2021) was a Russian serial child rapist and child murderer. He was sentenced to death for several rapes of young boys, two of which ended in fatalities. Later, in connection with the moratorium on the death penalty imposed by Boris Yeltsin, the verdict was replaced by life imprisonment.

== Biography ==
Irtyshov was born on 16 August 1971, in the Krasnodar Krai. He grew up in a dysfunctional family, with both his mother and father being alcoholics. When he was 10 he got into a car accident and got a serious craniocerebral injury as a result. He did not recover from the consequences: he was diagnosed with "an intellectual disability in the degree of moderate debility", after which his mother sent him to a special boarding school, in which Irtyshov was gangraped repeatedly.

After the boarding school, he graduated from a vocational school. In 1993 he moved to St. Petersburg, where he got a job as a dishwasher at the "Pegasus" coffeehouse, but his main source of income was homosexual prostitution. He was quite popular among his clients for his sadistic inclinations, and also was noted for hysteria, egocentrism and cowardice. Igor did not consider himself a homosexual, as he also had sex with women.

== Crimes ==
Irtyshov began his crimes in December 1993. While he was walking through the territory of Sosnovsky Park, he noticed two brothers, 11 and 12 years old respectively. Threatening them with a knife, the criminal took the children to a quiet, secluded place where he raped them, forcing them to drink something from a jar beforehand. As the boys later said, "the liquid had a strange taste and an unpleasant smell". Both victims received serious bodily injuries.

The next attack occurred in the Kolpinsky District of St. Petersburg. While violently abusing a boy, Irtyshov squeezed his throat too much, causing him to die from suffocation. Igor himself later said that he didn't want to kill him, but simply did not calculate the strength, because he was drunk. After this, an active search was conducted to catch the serial rapist. Many criminals who were brought to criminal responsibility for such offences were tried.

The next child Irtyshov raped was in May 1994. He dragged a 10-year-old boy into the attic of a house along Riga Avenue and brutally raped him. After the act of violence, Irtyshov manually tore apart the boy's perineum, leaving him permanently disabled. It is noteworthy that all the attacks were committed during the daytime, approximately between 12 and 18 hours, but the perpetrator managed to escape unnoticed. A month later he raped two more boys, 11 and 12 years old, on the banks of the Neva River.

A 15-year-old teenager almost became Irtyshov's seventh victim when he attacked the boy in an elevator. However, the boy managed to fight back and escape. On the same day, Irtyshov, angry at his previous failure, committed his eighth and final crime. After brutally raping a 9-year-old boy, he proceeded to tear out 30 feet of the victim's intestines. Miraculously, the boy survived and was able to give a detailed description of the attacker. After that, he was treated in a hospital in the United States, with calls for financial help on television for the necessary operation, but despite the fact that the necessary amount of intestines were collected for the organ transplantation, the boy ultimately died. This crime, like the many others of Irtyshov, was committed inside the stairwells of the apartment houses where victims lived.

== Arrest and trial ==
On the streets and in the newspapers, the rapist's facial composite and his verbal description were distributed. Irtyshov was frightened: the composite was very similar to him, which forced him to fly to Murmansk. A month later, having decided that everything had quieted down, Igor returned to St. Petersburg, where on 28 November 1994, he was detained by law enforcement agencies, which by that time had amassed a vast amount of evidence against him.

Irtyshov was "given up" by one of his lovers. After the last rape, Irtyshov brought the boy's briefcase home and boasted about it to his roommate. He suspected something was amiss and turned to the police. Soon Irtyshov was captured, and later many victims identified him.

For a long time, Irtyshov did not give any confessions. However, later he began to talk about the crimes and participated in investigative experiments. At the interrogations he behaved inadequately, and pretended to be mentally defective.

Psychiatric examinations of the killer took a long time. As a result, the experts identified a number of mental abnormalities, but in general, Irtyshov was declared sane. The case was then referred to the city court of St. Petersburg. Many forensic experts were inclined to believe that soon Irtyshov would begin to purposefully kill his victims, and in addition to rapes, there would be a chain of corpses.

Irtyshov noted that he liked the clinic where he was examined, and said that he would like to be recognized as insane and prescribed compulsory treatment. He said: "I'm crazy, since I did this... Exactly abnormal! I do not want to go to jail, put me in hospital, forever!" However, he was not recognized as insane, as he had enough intelligence to lead the investigation.

Irtyshov's trial was closed in order to avoid lynching. In total, he was accused of violating 15 articles from the Criminal Code of Russia. The court found Igor guilty of several articles, including murder, rape, serious bodily harm, and was sentenced to death. In 1999, in connection with Russia's accession with the Council of Europe, he, like all other people on death row at the time, was given life imprisonment by presidential decree.

As of 2000, he was detained in the special regime colony "Mordovian Zone" in the Sosnovka settlement in Mordovia. In February 2021 he died of heart failure.

== In the media ==
- Out of the Law (d/f) (1997)
- Life Imprisonment. Sentenced to Life (d/f) (2000)
- Lifetime Deprivation of Liberty. Confession of the Condemned (d/f, directed by Vakhtang Mikeladze) (2010)
- Ruthless and Very Dangerous (a film from the documentary series Law is the Law) (2016)

== See also ==
- List of Russian serial killers
- List of serial rapists

== Literature ==
- Nikolai Modestov: Maniacs...Blind Death: The Chronicle of Serial Killings - M.: Nadezhda-I, 1997. - 284 p. (Criminal secrets), - ISBN 5-86150-041-X
