= Nikolay Shubin =

Georgian-born Russian serial killer

- Николай Шубин
- Born: 1956 (age 69–70); Tbilisi, Georgian SSR, Soviet Union
- Other names: "The Cemetery Director" "Valre Bomzh" "The Chess Player"
- Conviction: Murder
- Penalty: Compulsory treatment

Details
- Victims: 13
- Span of crimes: 2004–2006
- Country: Russia
- State: Lipetsk
- Date apprehended: October 2006

Nikolay Pavlovich Shubin (Russian: Николай Павлович Шубин; born 1956), known as The Cemetery Director, is a Georgian-born Russian serial killer, who killed 13 homeless and single people between 2004 and 2006 in the city of Lipetsk.

== Biography ==
Shubin was born in Tbilisi. In 1976, Shubin was hospitalized in the Voronezh Regional Clinical Psychoneurogical Dispensary with a diagnosis of neurasthenia.

Shubin was arrested in October 2006, after policemen detained him in connection with the disappearance of a local pensioner named Mescheryakov. He had disappeared after going to the park to play a game of chess with Shubin. At the interrogation, Shubin immediately confessed to the murder and showed where he buried the body. During the investigation, he began to talk about another murder committed by him. Every week, he reported on his previous killings and showed the locations where the bodies were buried. Shubin always disoriented his victims with a strong blow to the head, then bound their hands and feet with wire, and finally strangled them with a garrot, which he always carried with him. He did not express any shame for his crimes and talked about them proudly and very confidently. Shubin called himself the "Cemetery Director". The motive for the murders was simple - a quarrel or a loss at a game of chess.

During the investigation, Shubin was examined and was diagnosed with a continuous type of paranoid schizophrenia. Because of this, the court found him unfit to stand trial and sentenced him to compulsory treatment.

== See also ==
- List of Russian serial killers
- List of serial killers by number of victims
