= Vladimir Dolgopolov =

Russian footballer

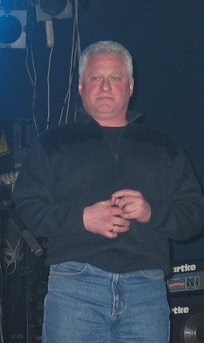

Personal information
- Full name: Vladimir Mikhailovich Dolgopolov
- Date of birth: 24 December 1961
- Place of birth: Leningrad, Russian SFSR, Soviet Union
- Date of death: 12 June 2016 (aged 54)
- Place of death: Saint Petersburg, Russia
- Height: 1.74 m (5 ft 8 1/2 in)
- Position: Defender

Senior career*
| Years | Team | Apps | (Gls) |
| 1979–1987 | FC Zenit Leningrad | 208 | (4) |
| 1988 | FC Dynamo Leningrad | 0 | (0) |
| 1988–1989 | FC Dynamo Moscow | 25 | (0) |
| 1989–1992 | FC Zenit St. Petersburg | 50 | (0) |
| 1992 | Vasa IFK | 20 | (1) |
| 1993–1994 | Tevalte Tallinn | 9 | (1) |
| 2000 | FC Lokomotiv St. Petersburg | 1 | (0) |
- * Club domestic league appearances and goals

Vladimir Mikhailovich Dolgopolov (Russian: Владимир Михайлович Долгополов; 24 December 1961 – 12 June 2016) was a Russian professional footballer. Dolgopolov made his debut in the Soviet Top League in 1980, playing for FC Zenit Leningrad, for which he won a Master of Sports of the USSR award.

In January 2016, Dolgopolov was found guilty of negligent homicide, and six-months into his sentence died due to complications from a stroke.

== Personal life ==
Vladimir Mikhailovich Dolgopolov was born on 24 December 1961, in Leningrad (now Saint Petersburg), Soviet Union. Dolgopolov had been married twice: to his first wife for 9 years, and later in 1991 he married his second wife, an air stewardess named Natalia, with whom he had a daughter, Daria.

== Honors ==
- Soviet Top League champion: 1984
- Soviet Top League bronze: 1980
- USSR Federation Cup finalist: 1986

== European club competitions ==
With FC Zenit Leningrad.

- 1987–88 UEFA Cup: 2 games
- 1989–90 UEFA Cup: 4 games

== Murder conviction ==
In September 2014, Dolgopolov was arrested on suspicion of murdering his wife, Natalia, and on 21 January 2016, he was found guilty of negligent homicide and sentenced to 10 years of imprisonment.

== Death ==
On 20 May 2016, Dolgopolov suffered a stroke while serving his sentence in Kresty Prison in Saint Petersburg. On 12 June 2016, he died in prison hospital.
