= Astafy Dolgopolov =

Russian confidence trickster and impostor

Astafy Trifonovich Dolgopolov (Астафий Трифонович Долгополов; 1725 – after 1797) was a Russian confidence trickster and impostor deceiving both Yemelyan Pugachev and Catherine II of Russia during the Pugachev Rebellion.

A merchant from Rzhev who had supplied Peter III with forage, he contracted some debts and went to Pugachev's headquarters during the climax of the rebellion, in June 1774. Dolgopolov presented himself as an envoy from the Grand Duke Pavel Petrovich to his alleged "father" (as Pugachev pretended to be Peter III), under the alias of Ivan Ivanov, ostensibly from Moscow. He claimed to have "recognized" Pugachev before his supporters as the true Peter III and also recalled a 1500 roubles-debt for oats that the deposed Emperor had left behind him. However Pugachev quickly understood his aims and Dolgopolov never received from him more than 50 roubles for travel expenses.

Then Dolgopolov embarked on a new dangerous enterprise, presenting himself to Catherine II as a Yaik Cossack named Trifonov who allegedly wanted to deliver Pugachev to the government. He invented a conspiration among the Cossacks and composed a whole letter with 300 signatures to the Empress and Grigory Orlov. Received in August in Tsarskoye Selo by Catherine, he received 2000 roubles as a prize and was sent to the Lower Volga in charge of a detachment instructed to find and capture Pugachev. In early September he additionally took another sum of 3000 roubles in golden coins from an officer sent together with him, and fled to Rzhev with all the money, as Pugachev had been already captured before the expedition could ever find his whereabouts.

The official investigation concluded that the merchant Dolgopolov from Rzhev, a loyal Cossack Trifonov decorated by the Empress, and Ivanov the "Tsesarevich's emissar" to Pugachev, were in fact the same person. He was arrested in Rzhev and sentenced by the Governing Senate to be scourged with knout, branded on his face and sent, permanently put into irons, to penal labor in Rågervik, now Paldiski in Estonia. However hard this punishment for his age of 50 might be, he lived well into his seventies, surviving Catherine II. His name occurs for the last time in 1797.
