= Federal Penitentiary Service =

Russian federal prison authority

Coordinates: 55°43′53″N 37°36′42″E

- Emblem of the Federal Penitentiary Service

- Flag of the Federal Penitentiary Service

Agency overview
- Formed: 2004; 22 years ago
- Superseding agency: GUIN
- Jurisdiction: Russia
- Headquarters: Zhitnaya Street 14 Yakimanka District, Central Administrative Okrug, Moscow
- Employees: 224,042
- Annual budget: 251.7 Billion Rubles (2024)
- Agency executive: Arkady Gostev, Director
- Parent agency: Ministry of Justice
- Website: fsin.gov.ru

The Federal Penitentiary Service (Russian: Федеральная служба исполнения наказаний, (Note: The official name of the Federal Penitentiary Service in Russian roughly translates to "Federal Service for the Execution of Punishments/Sentences" or "Federal Service of Punishment/Sentence Fulfillment" in English.) ФСИН, romanized: Federalnaya Sluzhba Ispolneniya Nakazaniy, FSIN) is a federal agency of the Ministry of Justice of Russia responsible for correctional services.

The FSIN is the federal authority for the detention of suspected and convicted persons, the security and maintenance of prisons in Russia, the transport of prisoners, and rehabilitation programs. As of March 2022, it operates 872 institutions (204 pre-trial SIZO institutions, 642 corrective colonies, 8 prisons, 18 juvenile colonies), with pre-trial detention facilities housing adult and juvenile offenders of various security levels, with the majority of penal facilities being corrective labor colonies. Its head office is located at Zhitnaya Street 14 in Yakimanka District, Central Administrative Okrug, Moscow.

The FSIN was established in 2004 as a new federal correctional service agency for the Ministry of Justice to replace the Soviet-era Main Administration for the Execution of Punishments (Главное управление исполнения наказаний, GUIN), formerly of the Ministry of Internal Affairs, and received its current name in 2006. It claims succession from the Main Prisons Directorate of the Russian Empire founded in 1879, and directly succeeds the correctional services of the Ministry of Internal Affairs of the Soviet Union including the Gulag agency.

== History ==
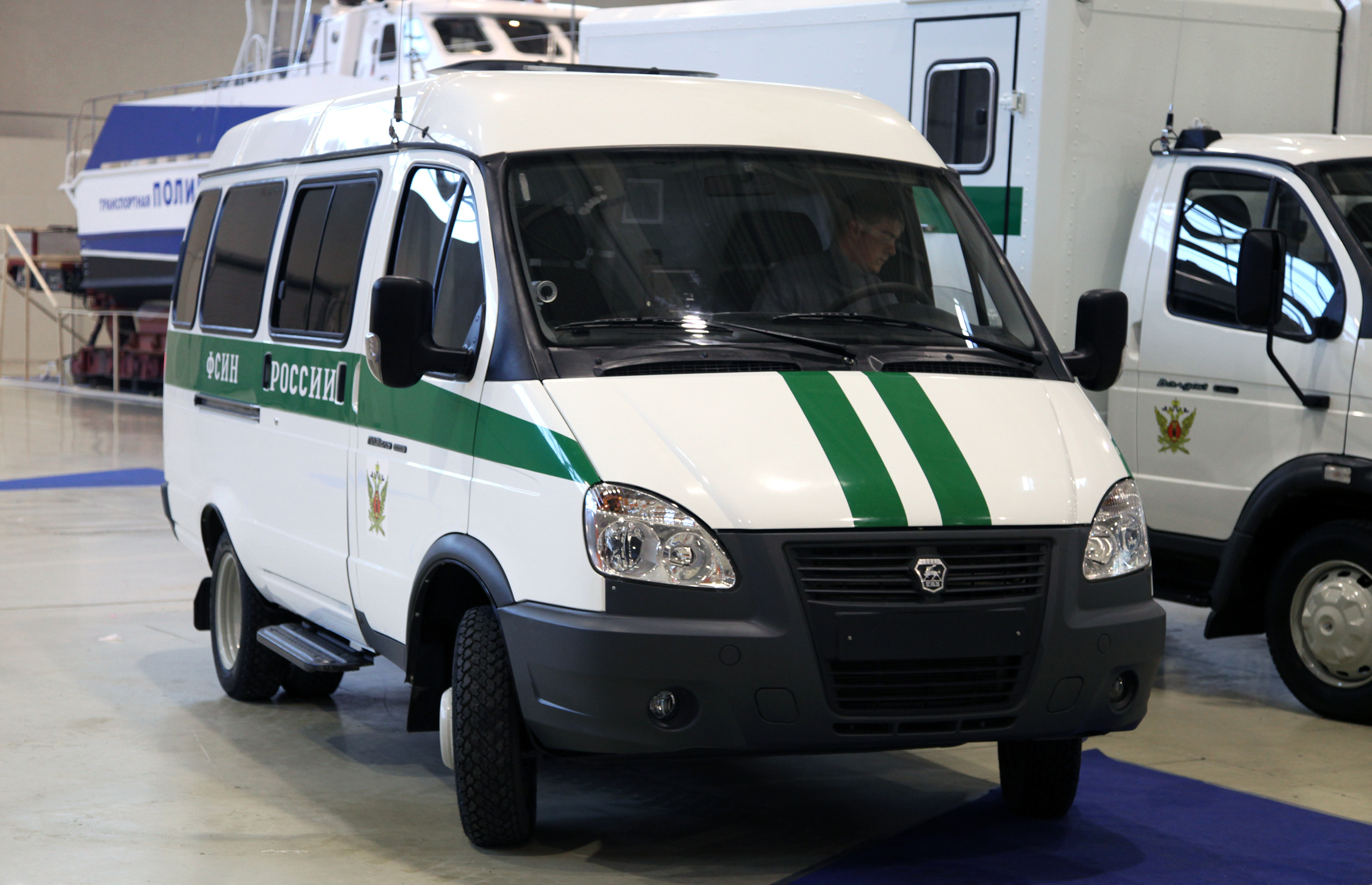
Color coating of a FSIN vehicle (GAZelle)

The Federal Penitentiary Service is considered to be successor to the Main Prison Administration, established on 27 February 1879 as the first government body dealing with maintenance and security of detention and prison facilities in the Russian Empire. On 13 December 1895, the Main Prison Administration was transferred from the Interior Ministry to the Ministry of Justice of the Russian Empire. Following the October Revolution, a new prison administration was established by the Bolsheviks with a system composed mainly of forced labour camps across the Soviet Union. On 7 April 1930, the Gulag agency was established which oversaw an expansion of the labour camp system in the Soviet Union. In 1960, the Main Administration for Execution of Punishments (GUIN) was founded under the Ministry of Internal Affairs of the Soviet Union following the dissolution of the Gulag agency. At the time of the collapse of the Soviet Union, all prisons and colonies were under the exclusive jurisdiction of the Ministry of Internal Affairs. In 1992, the Main Directorate for the Execution of Punishments (GUIN) was created to manage them. At the same time, due to growing crime, prisons were overcrowded with detainees, and conditions of detention were deteriorating. In 1994, all penitentiary departments began to report to one structure - the Ministry of Internal Affairs of the Russian Federation.

=== Creation of the FSIN ===
In 1996, Russia joined the Council of Europe. One of the main conditions for membership was the reform of the judicial and legal system to comply with international norms and standards. To this end, a number of European conventions were ratified: the European Convention for the Prevention of Torture and Inhuman or Degrading Treatment or Punishment, the Convention for the Protection of Human Rights and Fundamental Freedoms, the European Convention on Mutual Assistance in Criminal Matters, and the Convention on Laundering, Search, Seizure and Confiscation of the Proceeds from Crime and on the Financing of Terrorism.

Another condition was the transfer of all penal institutions and agencies from the Ministry of Internal Affairs to the control of the Ministry of Justice. According to international experts, such a reform provides more reliable guarantees of compliance with the rule of law and human rights, since it separates the bodies responsible for detention and investigation from the agencies supervising prisoners. The transfer of the penitentiary system to the Ministry of Justice took place on August 31, 1998. The penal system was given a number of new functions: escorting, searching for and detaining escaped criminals, medical care, executing sentences without isolating the convict from society and other measures of criminal-legal influence.

In 2004, the Federal Penitentiary Service was created as part of the Ministry of Justice. The Regulation on the FSIN was approved on October 13, 2004. In 2008, psychiatric hospitals (hospitals) of a specialized type with intensive observation were transferred to the FSIN's jurisdiction.

The FSIN was established in 2004 as part of various administrative reforms occurring in Russia reforming executive bodies from 2004 to 2005, maintaining the GUIN name but specially re-created for the Ministry of Justice. In 2006, the FSIN received its current name as the Federal Service for the Execution of Punishments (Russian: Федеральная служба исполнения наказаний (ФСИН)) under the Russian Ministry of Justice. The FSIN is commonly known in English as the Federal Penitentiary Service.

However, despite the formal transformations, prisons remained overcrowded and underfunded, with systematic violations of prisoners' rights observed. According to human rights activists, this was also due to the fact that, despite the formal transfer of the Federal Penitentiary Service to the Ministry of Justice, in practice the system was still run by people from the Ministry of Internal Affairs and the FSB. For example, in 2009-2012, the Federal Penitentiary Service was headed by Colonel General of the Ministry of Internal Affairs Alexander Reimer; in 2012-2019, by FSB Colonel General Gennady Kornienko, and since 2021, by Colonel General of the Ministry of Internal Affairs Arkady Gostev.

During the Russian invasion of Ukraine, according to a WSJ investigation, the head of the Federal Penitentiary Service of Russia for St. Petersburg and the Leningrad Oblast, Igor Potapenko, ordered his subordinates to "be cruel" to Ukrainian prisoners and use violence against them. Employees in other regions received similar orders.

== Tasks and powers ==
The main tasks of the FSIN are:

- the execution, in accordance with Russian legislation penal, detention of persons suspected or accused of committing crimes, and defendants;
- control the behavior of probationers and prisoners, which the court granted a deferment sentence;
- ensuring the protection of the rights, freedoms and legitimate interests of convicts and persons in custody;
- ensuring law and order in the institutions, enforcing criminal penalties of imprisonment (hereinafter - institutions executing punishment), and in detention centers, security contained in them convicts, persons in custody, as well as employees of the correctional system, officials and citizens in the territories of these institutions and detention facilities;
- protecting and escorting prisoners and persons detained on the specified routes escort, convoy of Russian citizens and stateless persons on the territory of the Russian Federation, as well as foreign citizens and stateless persons in the case of their extradition;
- Prisoners and detainees in detention, detention conditions, in accordance with international law, provisions of international treaties and federal laws;
- The organization of the activities to provide assistance to convicted in social adaptation;
- management of the territorial bodies of the FSIN directly subordinate agencies.

== Directors ==
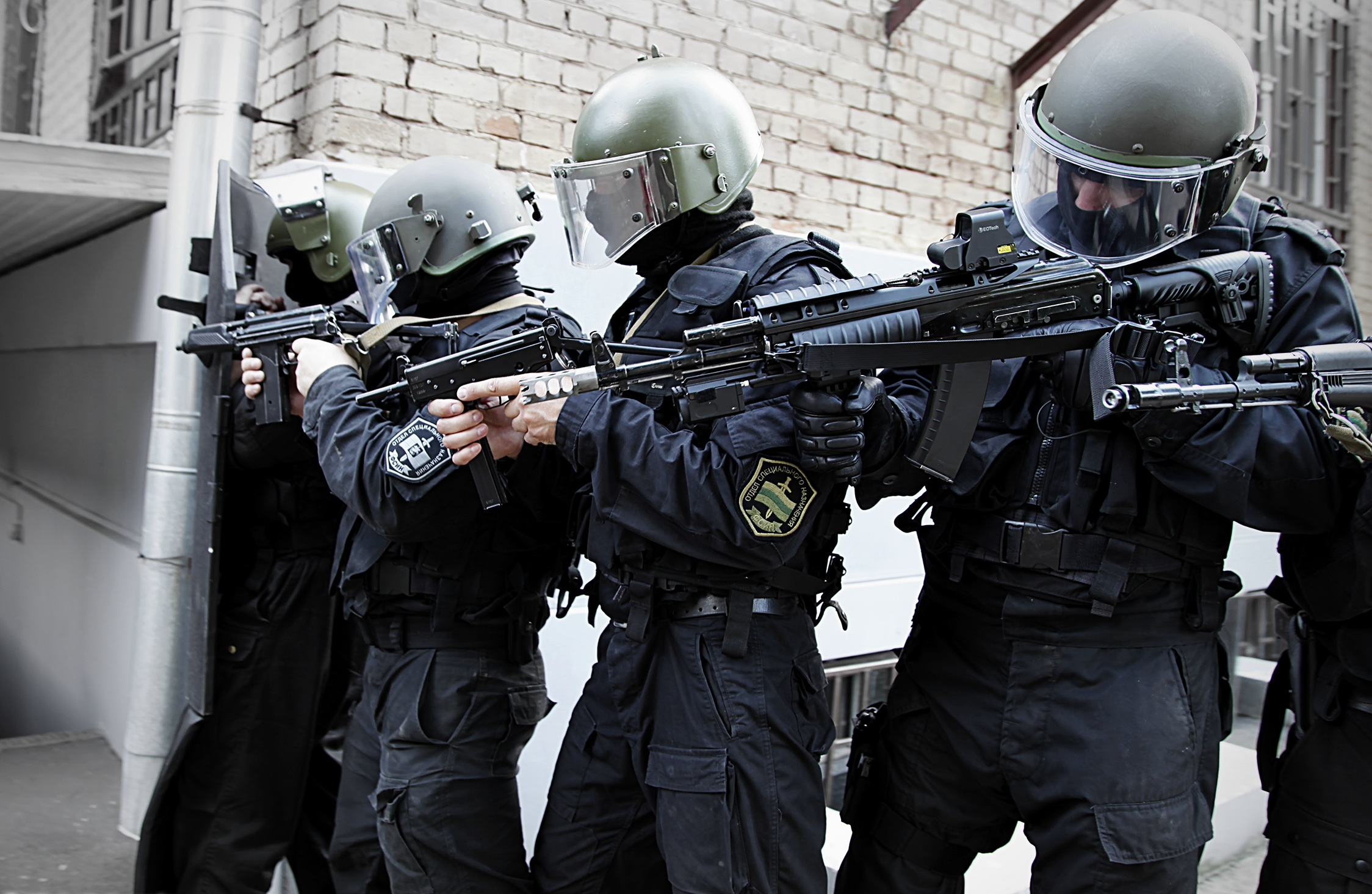
FSIN Special Forces during a FAB Defense training exercise

The FSIN is headed by the Director of the Federal Penitentiary Service, who is appointed and dismissed by the President of Russia on the recommendation of the Prime Minister of Russia. The Director is authorized to have six deputies, including one first deputy, who are appointed and dismissed by the President.

=== Chief of the Main Directorate for Correction of Punishments (GUIN) ===
- Yuri Kalinin (1992-1997)
- Vyacheslav Ovchinnikov (June 1997 - August 1998)
- Vladimir Yalunin (August 1998-15 December 2004)

=== Directors of the Federal Penitentiary Service ===
- Yuri Kalinin (December 2004 - 3 August 2009)
- Aleksandr Reymer (3 August 2009 - 26 June 2012)
- Gennady Kornienko (26 June 2012 - 1 October 2019)
- Aleksandr Kalashnikov (8 October 2019 - 25 November 2021)
- Arkady Gostev (25 November 2021- incumbent)

In 2007, Rabbi Aharon Gurevich was appointed the chief military rabbi, the first time to hold this position in Russia since 1917, serving as the chief rabbi for Jewish inmates and officers in Russian federal prison system.

== Population ==
The number of prisoners per 100,000 citizens by country

As of March 2019, the FSIN was responsible for 558,778 inmates, including pre-trial detainees. Only 8% of prisoners in Russia were female, and 0.2% were juvenile offenders. As of 2018, Russia had one of the highest incarceration rates in the world at 416 per 100,000 people with a prison population ranked fourth behind the United States, China, and Brazil. Before 2000 Russia was ranked as having the highest incarceration rate per 100,000 people internationally until it was overtaken by the United States. between 2000 and 2018, Russia’s prison population dropped substantially with a decline of over 400,000 inmates, thanks among other factors, to the socioeconomic reforms and overall increase in standards and quality of life.

The FSIN operated 705 places of worship within its facilities for inmates of various faiths including Orthodoxy, Islam, Buddhism, and Catholicism.

== Facilities ==
As of 2019, the FSIN operated 954 facilities of various types located across Russia. The majority of prisons are "corrective labor colonies", a type of penal colony that combines detention with compulsory work introduced during the Soviet era, but also operates a number of traditional prisons.

=== Prisons for life sentence ===
The FSIN has eight special correctional facilities only for prisoners serving life sentences and those formerly sentenced to death:

Common name	Full Name	Location	Opened	Notes
Ognenny Ostrov; Огненный остров ("Pyatak/Volgoda Nickel")	Federal State Institution "Correctional Colony No. 5 of the Office of the Federal Penitentiary Service in the Vologda Oblast"	Belozersky District, Vologda Oblast	1953	Capacity of 505 inmates, including 55 cell high-security section.
Snowflake; Snezhinka; Снежинка	Federal state institution "Correctional Colony No. 6 of the Office of the Federal Penitentiary Service in the Khabarovsk Krai"	Elban, Khabarovsk Krai	2017	Capacity of 378 inmates.
White Swan; Belyy Lebed; Белый лебедь	Federal State Institution "Association of Correctional Colonies No. 2 with special economic conditions for the Main Directorate of the Federal Penitentiary Service in the Perm Krai"	Solikamsk, Perm Krai	1938	Capacity of 962 inmates.
Black Berkut; Chyorniy berkut Чёрный беркут	Federal state institution "Correctional Colony No. 56 of the Office of the Federal Penitentiary Service in the Sverdlovsk Oblast"	Ivdel, Sverdlovsk Oblast	1935	Capacity of 469 inmates.
Torbeyev Central (ru); Torbeyevskiy tsentral Торбеевский централ	Federal state institution "Correctional Colony No. 6 of the Office of the Federal Penitentiary Service in the Republic of Mordovia"	Torbeyevo, Mordovia	2015	Capacity of 210 inmates.
Black Dolphin; Chyorniy delʹfin Чёрный дельфин	Federal State Institution "Correctional Colony No. 6 of the Office of the Federal Penitentiary Service in the Orenburg Oblast"	Sol-Iletsk, Orenburg Oblast	1773	Capacity of 1600 inmates.
Polar Owl; Polyarnaya sova Полярная сова	Federal State Institution "Correctional Colony No. 18 of the Office of the Federal Penitentiary Service in the Yamal-Nenets Autonomous Okrug"	Kharp, Yamal-Nenets Autonomous Okrug	1961	Capacity of 1014 inmates
Mordovian Zone (ru); Mordovskaya zona Мордовская зона	Federal State Institution "Correctional Colony No. 1 of the Office of the Federal Penitentiary Service in the Republic of Mordovia"	Zubovo-Polyansky District, Mordovia	1931	Capacity of 1005 inmates.

=== Federal penal colonies ===
Common name	Full Name	Location	Opened	Notes
Segezha Correctional Colony (ru); Segezhskaya ispavitel'naya koloniya Сегежская исправительная колония	Federal state institution "Correctional Colony No. 7 of the Federal Penitentiary Service of Russia for the Republic of Karelia"	Segezha, Karelia	1968	Capacity of 1342 inmates.
Lgov Prison; L'govskaya koloniya Льго́вская коло́ния	Federal State Institution “Correctional Colony No. 3 of the Office of the Federal Penitentiary Service in the Kursk Region”	Lgov, Kursk Oblast	1961	Capacity of 1,560 inmates.

=== Special purpose units ===
Every regional office of Federal Penitentiary Service has its own special purpose unit, whose tasks include rescuing the hostages, providing security during transportation of prisoners, anti-riot tasks in penitentiary facilities etc. Most of FSIN special purpose units were involved in special tasks during both Chechen Wars and their aftermath.

== See also ==
- Russian penal military units
