= State Courier Service =

Coordinates: 55°45′11″N 37°38′16″E

State Courier Service of the Russian Federation
- State Courier flag, 2001

- State Courier emblem

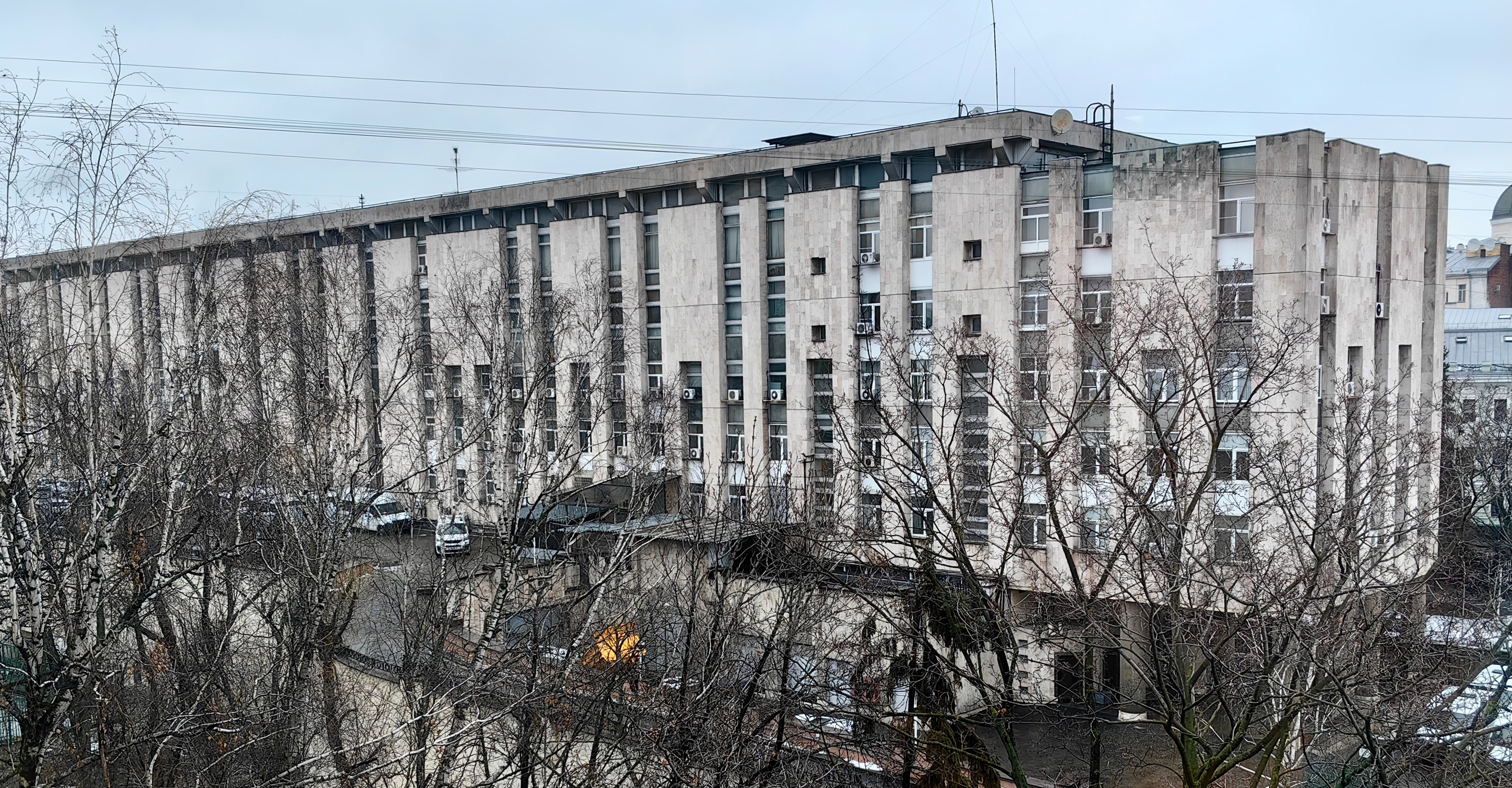
- State Courier Service headquarters in Moscow

Agency overview
- Formed: December 17, 1796
- Preceding agency: Courier Corps
- Jurisdiction: Russia
- Headquarters: 8 Solyanka Street Moscow
- Employees: 1,000
- Agency executives: Valery Tikhonov, Director of State Courier; Vladimir Bocharnikov, First Deputy Director; Aleksander Kaledkin, Deputy Director
- Parent agency: Presidential Administration of Russia
- Website: gfs.gov.ru

The State Courier Service (Russian: Государственная фельдъегерская служба Российской Федерации, ГФС, romanized: Gosudarstvennaya fel'dyegerskaya sluzhba Rossiyskoy Federatsii, GFS) is a federal body of executive authority responsible for federal courier communications Russia.

The current director is Valery Tikhonov, who was appointed by Vladimir Putin on June 26, 2012. Previously, he was the vice governor of Saint Petersburg since 2004.

== Background ==
The State Courier Service of the Russian Federation (GFS of Russia) is a federal executive authority performing specific functions in the area of federal courier in the Russian Federation, and is a system of federal bodies of executive authority, which provides guidance to the president of the Russian Federation.

The GFS of Russia headed by the Director of the State Courier Service of the Russian Federation who shall be appointed and dismissed by the president of the Russian Federation.

== History ==
The Courier/Feldjäger Corps was created on December 17, 1796, by Imperial decree of the Emperor Pavel I. The personnel of the Corps Courier were ensure the delivery of orders, reports, securities, parcels, as well as support for high-ranking officials, and was operated under the College of War.

After the October Revolution of 1917, the successor to the Imperial Courier Service Corps has an external link All-Russian General Staff, and from 1920 – The Courier Corps of the Red Army. On August 6, 1921 The Courier links service was created as part of the Cheka.

On November 25, 1991 The Courier Service Office was part of the Ministry of Communications of the USSR and was transformed into the State Courier Service of the RSFSR in the Ministry of Communications of the Russian SFSR.

On September 30, 1992 The State Courier Service of the Ministry of Communications of the Russian Federation was transformed into a Federal Courier under the Ministry of Communications of the Russian Federation.

On January 24, 1995 The Federal Office of Communications under the Ministry of Courier and Communications of Russia was reorganized into the State Courier Service of the Russian Federation (GFS of Russia) as the current name.

On September 6, 1996 the State Courier Service of the Russian Federation was reorganized into the State Courier Service of the Russian Federation under the Ministry of Communications of Russia.

On August 20, 1997 the State Courier Service of the Russian Federation was reorganized and subordinated directly to the Government of Russia.

On May 17, 2000 the State Courier Service of the Russian Government was reorganized into the State Courier Service under the President of the Russian Federation.

== Structure ==
The Courier Communications Division located in all provincial, regional and national centers of Russia, as well as in a number of large cities, are of economic importance.

In a unified system of federal courier division includes the central office, regional offices (in Moscow, eight departments of the federal districts, 73 departments and offices in the capitals and administrative centers of the Russian Federation, as well as a department in the city of Sochi).

The Agencies of the Federal courier mail delivery will take place on 112 permanent routes: 60 aviation, 36 rail and 16 road. Every day in airplanes and trains, there are about 300 employees of the federal courier. In addition, regular meetings are carried out and seeing members of the Inter-governmental courier arriving in Moscow on 12 inter-state routes.

== Tasks ==
The main tasks of the GFS Russia, according to the provisions of paragraph 2, are:

- to ensure prompt delivery and guaranteed safety of items of particular importance, top secret, secret service and other items:
  - President of the Russian Federation, federal bodies of state authority;
  - Prosecution of the Russian Federation;
  - public authorities of the Russian Federation;
  - local governments to address the Government of the Russian Federation;
- members of the Federal Assembly of the Russian Federation and deputies of the State Duma of the Russian Federation, deputies of * legislative (representative) bodies of state power of subjects of the Russian Federation;
  - Russian Ministry of Defense, Russian Armed Forces, combating arms, military districts, fleets, regional commands Troops of Russia and territorial bodies of the Federal Security Service of Russia;
- administration of industrial and military sites which are of particular public importance by the decision of the Government;
- Shipping overseas correspondence, as well as technical documentation and samples of industrial products by the president of the Russian Federation and (or) the Government of the Russian Federation;
- delivery of correspondence foreign heads of state and heads of governments of foreign states, public authorities of states – members of the Inter-governmental Agreement on the courier;
- mail delivery of the Commonwealth of Independent States, located on the territory of the Russian Federation.

== Directors ==
Heads of Russian State Courier Service since 1796:

=== Imperial Russia ===
- Shelagin (1796–1799)
- Nikolai Kastorsky (1799–1814)
- Bogdan Tiesenhausen (1814–1817)
- Stepan Dyuzhakov (1817–1823)
- Mikhail Vasiliev (1823–1827)
- Yakov Dieterichs (1827–1832)
- Yakov Sachs (1832–1850)
- Vasily Babushkin (1850–1855)
- Alexey Bushen (1855–1858)
- Emile Krause (1858–1878)
- Karl Von-Meier (1878–1888)
- Adolf Von-Vitt (1888–1905)
- Mikhail Sipyagin (1905–1909)
- Aleksander Nosov (1909–1918)

=== Soviet Russia ===
- Yakov Gaikazov (1918–1920)
- Ippolit Eismont (1920–1921)
- Ivan Bushkov (1921–1924)
- Pavel Mitrofanov (1921–1923)
- Military Commission – Samokatchiki unit (1917–1922)
- Vladimir Zhukov (1924–1936)
- Alievsky, Volkov, Zuev, Belyanin (1936–1941)
- Yosif Rybak (1941–1949)
- Boris Krasnopevtsev (1949–1983)
- Boris Bredikhin (1983–1986)
- Gennady Popov (1986–1991)

=== Federal Russia ===
- Valery Andreyev (1991—1995)
- Victor Solkin (1995—1999)
- Andrei Chernenko (1999—2002)
- Gennady Kornienko (2002—2012)
- Valery Tikhonov (Since June 26, 2012)

== See also ==
- Awards of the State Courier Service of Russia
- Special Communications Service of Russia under the FSO
