= Igor Ptitsyn =

Russian serial killer (born 1974)

- Игорь Птицын
- Born: Igor Gennadievich Ptitsyn; 1974 (age 51–52); Soviet Union
- Other name: "Kazan Maniac"
- Convictions: Murder (3 counts); Rape
- Penalty: Life imprisonment in a special regime colony

Details
- Victims: 3+
- Span of crimes: 2009–2011
- Country: Russia
- State: Tatarstan
- Date apprehended: 16 February 2021

Igor Gennadievich Ptitsyn (Russian: Игорь Геннадьевич Птицын; born 1974), also known as the Kazan Maniac, is a Russian serial killer and rapist who murdered at least three women during a series of sexually motivated attacks committed between 2009 and 2017 in Tatarstan. He was arrested in February 2021 and sentenced to life imprisonment.

== Biography ==
Igor Ptitsyn was a former member of the National Guard, a historian, and, at the time of his arrest, was employed as a security guard at a plant in Kazan, beginning in 2012. He had never married and had no known children. According to colleagues, he was a calm and balanced person who had no conflicts with anyone. Neighbors described him as a well-dressed, polite man who lived with his elderly mother and didn't drink, smoke, or use profanity. However, they found it odd that he seemed to have no romantic interest in women, speculating that he may have previously been in a troubled relationship.

== Attacks ==
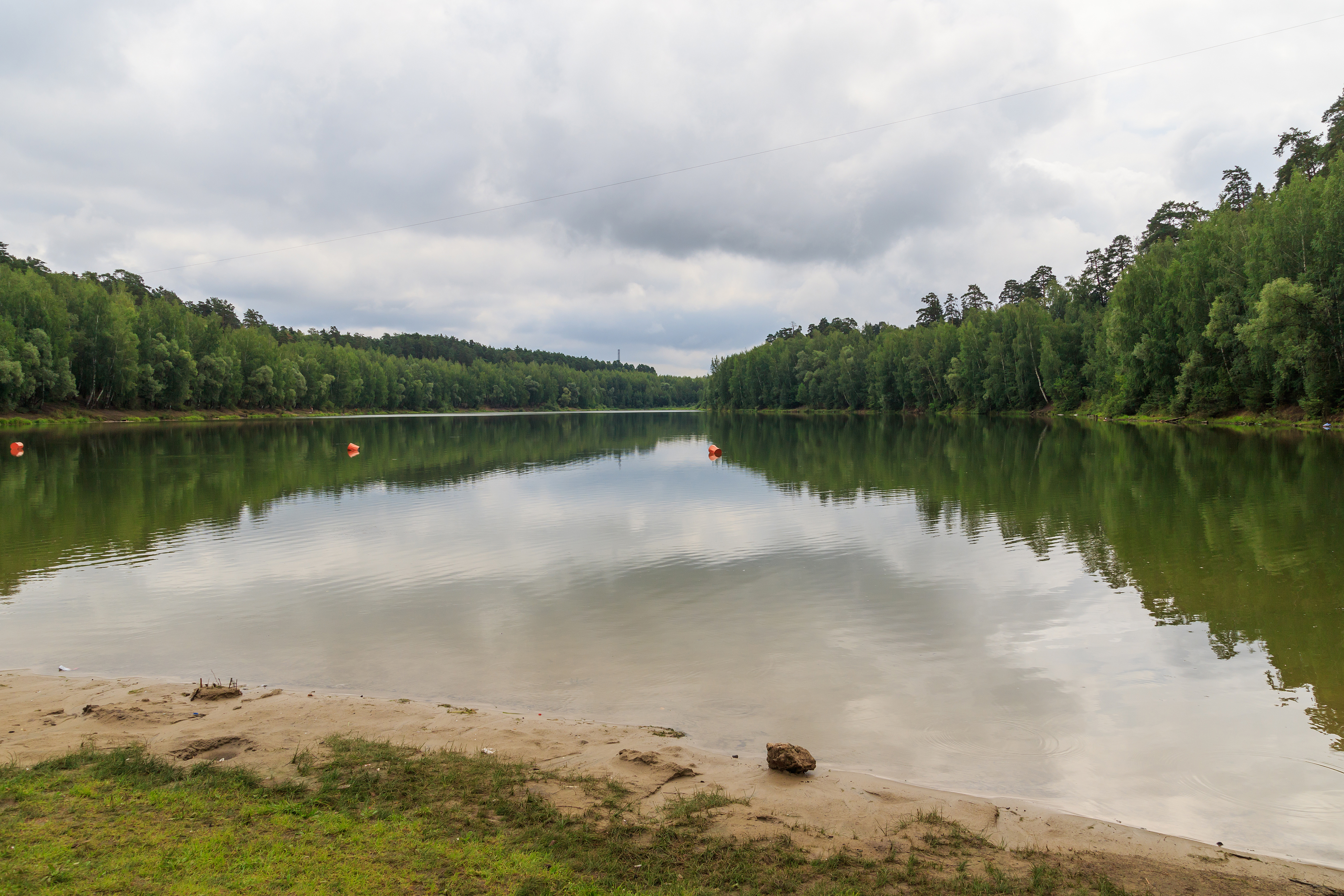
Lake Glubokoe, where Ptitsyn committed most of his attacks

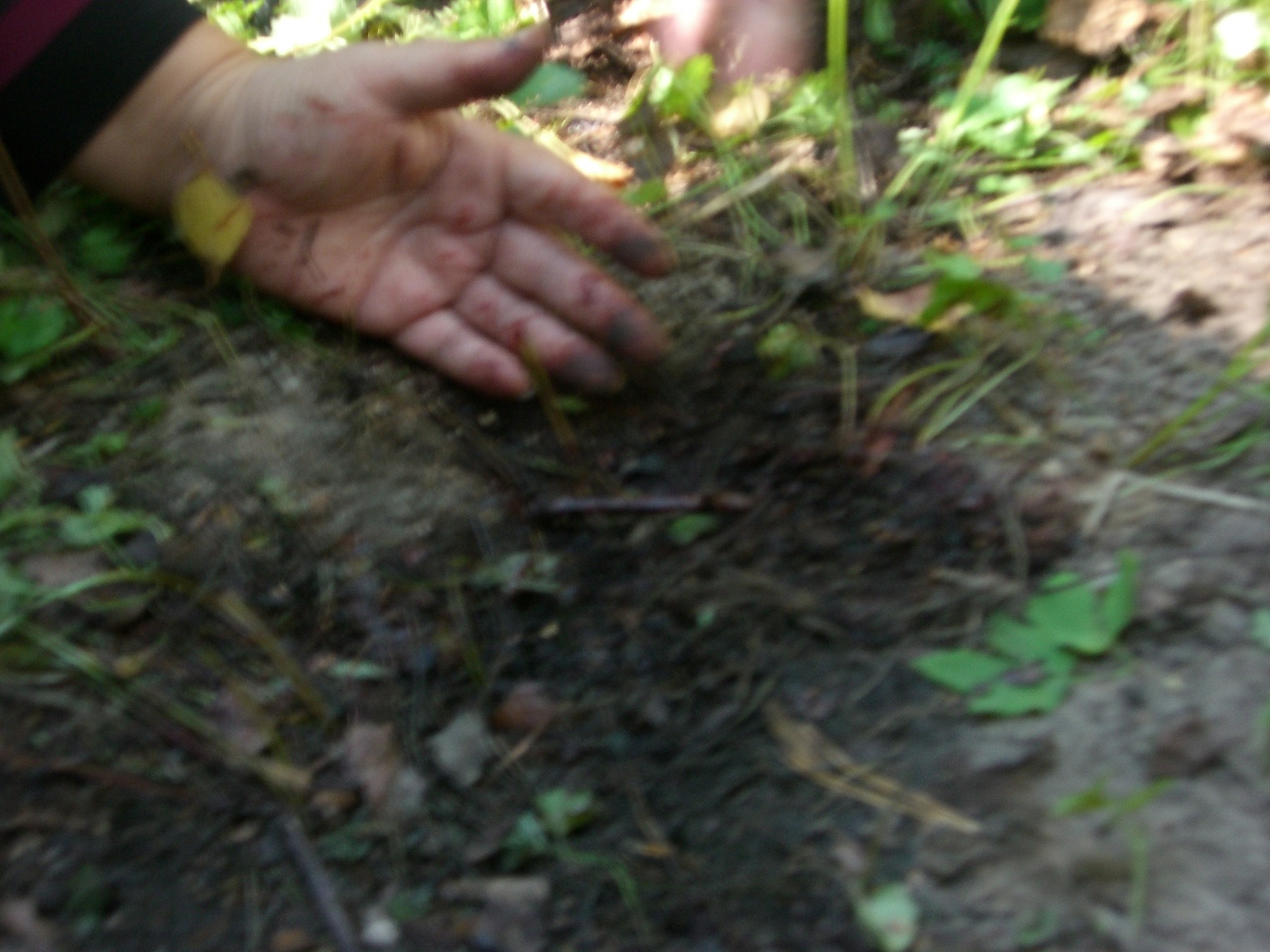
Blood-soaked soil from the Maksimova crime scene

In late August 2009, the half-naked body of 30-year-old Yulia Yu was discovered in a tree plantation near the street in Kazan's Aircraft Construction District. Her head had been savagely beaten with a stone.

On 21 May 2011, 22-year-old Inna Solodyankina was reported missing by her mother after she had stopped answering phone calls. She was last seen at Lake Glubokoe in Kazan. After a lengthy search by police and volunteers, she was located three days later in a nearby tree plantation, alive but comatose and with a severe head injury. She later recovered from the attack, although she had no recollection of what had happened.

On 17 July, 16-year-old Ksenia Antonova went to Vorovsky Forest Park to meet her boyfriend. Several hours later, she was found laying face-down without pants or underwear, having been raped and beaten to death with a blunt object.

On 19 August, 17-year-old Dasha Maksimova was murdered at Lake Glubokoe. She frequently sunbathed at the lake, and on that day she had agreed to go with a friend. After her friend cancelled their plans, Maksimova went alone. After being accosted by several men at the lake, she had arranged to be picked up by her boyfriend, but shortly after the conversation, her phone went silent. Maksimova's body was later discovered heavily mutilated in the forest, with half of her skull smashed. There were no signs of robbery, as her money and jewellery were not taken by the assailant. Unlike the other attacks, Maksimova was not raped; investigators believed the perpetrator had not had time to finish his assault. Several suspects were arrested but released due to a lack of evidence.

== Arrest and trial ==
Due to modern developments in forensic science, Ptitsyn was arrested on 16 February 2021, after his DNA was connected to the murder of Yulia Yu. Authorities determined that Yu and Ptitsyn had not known each other but had a "chance meeting" while Yu was inebriated and returning home. The encounter ended with Ptitsyn murdering her after she mocked him for reaching orgasm too quickly. He was subsequently charged with her murder.

After hearing the news of his arrest, the mother of Dasha Maksimova suspected Ptitsyn of being responsible for the murder of her daughter and contacted the authorities. Unbeknownst to her, Ptitsyn had already confessed to Maksimova's murder, as well as the murders of Yu and Antonova and an additional three victims who survived, the most recent being in 2017. On March 3, Ptitsyn was transferred to a pre-trial detention centre.

In October 2022, Ptitsyn was found guilty of three murders. It was revealed that he had committed a total of ten attacks and, by his own admission, 22 more rapes, most of which occurred near Lake Glubokoe. The victims of these attacks could not be located. He recalled one instance in which he raped a mother walking down a path in view of her child. Ptitsyn apologized before the court and asked for the most severe punishment, and as such, he was sentenced to life imprisonment in a special regime colony, where he remains today.

== See also ==
- List of Russian serial killers
