= Viktor Sotnikov (serial killer) =

Russian serial killer

Viktor Sotnikov Виктор Cотников
- Born: Viktor Viktorovich Sotnikov; 26 November 1961 (age 64); Gryazi, Lipetsk Oblast, Soviet Union
- Conviction: Murder
- Penalty: Life imprisonment

Details
- Victims: 8
- Span of crimes: 2000–2011
- Country: Russia
- States: Lipetsk, Tambov

Viktor Viktorovich Sotnikov (Russian: Виктор Викторович Сотников; born 26 November 1961) is a Russian serial killer, convicted for the killing of 8 people in Lipetsk Oblast and Tambov Oblast between 2000 and 2011.

== Background ==
Viktor Viktorovich Sotnikov was born in 1961, in Gryazi, Lipetsk Oblast, Soviet Union. Sotnikov grew up in an unstable household, and during his childhood he began to torture animals, even hanging the family dog. In his early adulthood, he started abusing his parents and sisters, and sold illegal moonshine. Sotnikov was accused of raping two women but paid the women to drop their accusations.

== Murders ==
On 30 September 2000, Sotnikov committed his first murder when he killed a 19-year-old girl, who he offered to give a ride. According to Sotnikov, she voluntarily agreed to go to his house and have a drink, where a quarrel started between them, and where she ended up being beaten to death. Later the mother of the victim denied this version of events, stating that she believed Sotnikov dragged her daughter into the house by force.

Sotnikov is not known to have committed another murder until 2002, when together with a partner, Alexander Lenshin, they spotted a 25-year-old woman walking alongside the road they were driving along. The woman was offered a ride which she accepted, but after rejecting advances by Sotnikov he attacked her, beating her to death. Lenshin then stabbed the woman in the chest to make sure she was dead. The two attempted to dump the body in the Matyra River, however, they could not stop the body from floating in the water, instead hiding the body in rubble at an abandoned limestone crushing plant.

On the day of New Year 2003, Sotnikov and Lenshin kidnapped a 31-year-old woman who was drunk because of New Year's celebrations, loading her into the car and taking her to a deserted area, where the two dumped her. The drunken woman died when she could not reach shelter over that winter night, and subsequently froze to death. In March 2003, in the Petrovsky District of Tambov Oblast, Sotnikov and Lenshin killed a 46-year-old man who had asked them to take him to Tambov. The body was thrown on the side of the road and covered with snow. A few days later the two killed a 66-year-old pensioner, who had asked for a ride to the Dobrinsky District of Lipetsk Oblast.

In December 2005, Sotnikov drank alcohol with a 32-year-old woman who he had promised to take to Lipetsk. On the way to the city, he instead drove to Matyrskomu reservoir, where he abandoned the drunken woman in the snow and left, where she died from hypothermia. Sotnikov did not commit another known murder until April 2010, when he then put the girl and his wife in the car and took them to the Matyra River, where he killed the girl and burned the body. His last known murder was committed in November 2011, when Sotnikov asked to help a homeless man gather firewood, and then invited him to go with him to the village. Sotnikov killed the man in the forest and abandoned the body there. After the discovery of the body, witnesses came forward saying they had seen Sotnikov with the homeless man offering to help cut firewood.

== Arrest and conviction ==
Sotnikov was arrested after being identified by the witnesses during the investigation of the homeless man's murder. He attempted to claim he was insane, but he was proven to be sane during the killings. On 22 October 2013, Sotnikov was found guilty of 8 murders in Lipetsk Oblast and Tambov Oblast and was sentenced to life imprisonment. In his final statement, he apologized to the victims, his wife and said that he repents committing the crimes. His accomplice, Alexander Lenshin, was sentenced to 19-years imprisonment for his involvement in some of the murders.

== See also ==
- List of Russian serial killers
